

594001–594100 

|-bgcolor=#fefefe
| 594001 ||  || — || March 15, 2012 || Mount Lemmon || Mount Lemmon Survey ||  || align=right data-sort-value="0.86" | 860 m || 
|-id=002 bgcolor=#E9E9E9
| 594002 ||  || — || December 29, 2014 || Haleakala || Pan-STARRS ||  || align=right data-sort-value="0.89" | 890 m || 
|-id=003 bgcolor=#fefefe
| 594003 ||  || — || October 15, 2004 || Kitt Peak || M. W. Buie, D. E. Trilling ||  || align=right data-sort-value="0.74" | 740 m || 
|-id=004 bgcolor=#fefefe
| 594004 ||  || — || June 3, 2009 || Mount Lemmon || Mount Lemmon Survey ||  || align=right data-sort-value="0.87" | 870 m || 
|-id=005 bgcolor=#fefefe
| 594005 ||  || — || February 20, 2009 || Kitt Peak || Spacewatch ||  || align=right data-sort-value="0.75" | 750 m || 
|-id=006 bgcolor=#fefefe
| 594006 ||  || — || October 12, 2007 || Mount Lemmon || Mount Lemmon Survey ||  || align=right data-sort-value="0.70" | 700 m || 
|-id=007 bgcolor=#fefefe
| 594007 ||  || — || October 22, 2011 || Kitt Peak || Spacewatch ||  || align=right data-sort-value="0.59" | 590 m || 
|-id=008 bgcolor=#fefefe
| 594008 ||  || — || February 4, 2016 || Haleakala || Pan-STARRS ||  || align=right data-sort-value="0.68" | 680 m || 
|-id=009 bgcolor=#fefefe
| 594009 ||  || — || February 24, 2012 || Mount Lemmon || Mount Lemmon Survey ||  || align=right data-sort-value="0.60" | 600 m || 
|-id=010 bgcolor=#fefefe
| 594010 ||  || — || April 28, 2001 || Kitt Peak || Spacewatch ||  || align=right data-sort-value="0.83" | 830 m || 
|-id=011 bgcolor=#fefefe
| 594011 ||  || — || October 10, 2007 || Mount Lemmon || Mount Lemmon Survey ||  || align=right data-sort-value="0.53" | 530 m || 
|-id=012 bgcolor=#fefefe
| 594012 Bulavina ||  ||  || December 27, 2011 || Mayhill-ISON || L. Elenin ||  || align=right data-sort-value="0.86" | 860 m || 
|-id=013 bgcolor=#fefefe
| 594013 ||  || — || December 18, 2011 || ESA OGS || ESA OGS ||  || align=right data-sort-value="0.65" | 650 m || 
|-id=014 bgcolor=#fefefe
| 594014 ||  || — || April 30, 2005 || Kitt Peak || Spacewatch ||  || align=right data-sort-value="0.93" | 930 m || 
|-id=015 bgcolor=#fefefe
| 594015 ||  || — || April 11, 2002 || Anderson Mesa || LONEOS ||  || align=right | 1.0 km || 
|-id=016 bgcolor=#fefefe
| 594016 ||  || — || May 2, 2006 || Mount Lemmon || Mount Lemmon Survey ||  || align=right data-sort-value="0.69" | 690 m || 
|-id=017 bgcolor=#fefefe
| 594017 ||  || — || November 16, 2003 || Apache Point || SDSS Collaboration ||  || align=right data-sort-value="0.89" | 890 m || 
|-id=018 bgcolor=#E9E9E9
| 594018 ||  || — || January 18, 2016 || Haleakala || Pan-STARRS ||  || align=right data-sort-value="0.99" | 990 m || 
|-id=019 bgcolor=#E9E9E9
| 594019 ||  || — || May 3, 2008 || Mount Lemmon || Mount Lemmon Survey ||  || align=right data-sort-value="0.64" | 640 m || 
|-id=020 bgcolor=#fefefe
| 594020 ||  || — || September 15, 2006 || Kitt Peak || Spacewatch ||  || align=right data-sort-value="0.65" | 650 m || 
|-id=021 bgcolor=#fefefe
| 594021 ||  || — || March 20, 2002 || Kitt Peak || Spacewatch ||  || align=right data-sort-value="0.70" | 700 m || 
|-id=022 bgcolor=#fefefe
| 594022 ||  || — || March 2, 2009 || Mount Lemmon || Mount Lemmon Survey ||  || align=right data-sort-value="0.66" | 660 m || 
|-id=023 bgcolor=#E9E9E9
| 594023 ||  || — || March 15, 2012 || Kitt Peak || Spacewatch ||  || align=right data-sort-value="0.80" | 800 m || 
|-id=024 bgcolor=#E9E9E9
| 594024 ||  || — || March 24, 2003 || Kitt Peak || Spacewatch ||  || align=right | 1.2 km || 
|-id=025 bgcolor=#fefefe
| 594025 ||  || — || January 19, 2012 || Haleakala || Pan-STARRS ||  || align=right data-sort-value="0.58" | 580 m || 
|-id=026 bgcolor=#fefefe
| 594026 ||  || — || December 29, 2011 || Kitt Peak || Spacewatch ||  || align=right data-sort-value="0.81" | 810 m || 
|-id=027 bgcolor=#E9E9E9
| 594027 ||  || — || September 15, 2013 || Haleakala || Pan-STARRS ||  || align=right data-sort-value="0.91" | 910 m || 
|-id=028 bgcolor=#fefefe
| 594028 ||  || — || January 13, 2005 || Kitt Peak || Spacewatch ||  || align=right data-sort-value="0.63" | 630 m || 
|-id=029 bgcolor=#fefefe
| 594029 ||  || — || November 17, 2007 || Mount Lemmon || Mount Lemmon Survey ||  || align=right data-sort-value="0.59" | 590 m || 
|-id=030 bgcolor=#fefefe
| 594030 ||  || — || August 15, 2006 || Palomar || NEAT ||  || align=right data-sort-value="0.81" | 810 m || 
|-id=031 bgcolor=#fefefe
| 594031 ||  || — || January 8, 2016 || Haleakala || Pan-STARRS ||  || align=right data-sort-value="0.61" | 610 m || 
|-id=032 bgcolor=#E9E9E9
| 594032 Reyhersamuel ||  ||  || August 23, 2004 || La Silla || S. F. Hönig, W. J. Duschl ||  || align=right | 2.0 km || 
|-id=033 bgcolor=#fefefe
| 594033 ||  || — || July 25, 2014 || Haleakala || Pan-STARRS ||  || align=right data-sort-value="0.49" | 490 m || 
|-id=034 bgcolor=#E9E9E9
| 594034 ||  || — || March 5, 2016 || Haleakala || Pan-STARRS ||  || align=right | 1.4 km || 
|-id=035 bgcolor=#fefefe
| 594035 ||  || — || March 7, 2016 || Haleakala || Pan-STARRS ||  || align=right data-sort-value="0.55" | 550 m || 
|-id=036 bgcolor=#E9E9E9
| 594036 ||  || — || September 23, 2013 || Mount Lemmon || Mount Lemmon Survey ||  || align=right data-sort-value="0.99" | 990 m || 
|-id=037 bgcolor=#fefefe
| 594037 ||  || — || April 26, 2001 || Kitt Peak || Spacewatch ||  || align=right data-sort-value="0.56" | 560 m || 
|-id=038 bgcolor=#fefefe
| 594038 ||  || — || March 10, 2016 || Haleakala || Pan-STARRS ||  || align=right data-sort-value="0.64" | 640 m || 
|-id=039 bgcolor=#fefefe
| 594039 ||  || — || October 10, 2007 || Mount Lemmon || Mount Lemmon Survey ||  || align=right data-sort-value="0.64" | 640 m || 
|-id=040 bgcolor=#E9E9E9
| 594040 ||  || — || April 16, 2012 || Kitt Peak || Spacewatch ||  || align=right data-sort-value="0.84" | 840 m || 
|-id=041 bgcolor=#fefefe
| 594041 ||  || — || September 17, 2010 || Mount Lemmon || Mount Lemmon Survey ||  || align=right data-sort-value="0.64" | 640 m || 
|-id=042 bgcolor=#E9E9E9
| 594042 ||  || — || September 21, 2009 || Mount Lemmon || Mount Lemmon Survey ||  || align=right data-sort-value="0.60" | 600 m || 
|-id=043 bgcolor=#E9E9E9
| 594043 ||  || — || March 29, 2012 || Haleakala || Pan-STARRS ||  || align=right data-sort-value="0.67" | 670 m || 
|-id=044 bgcolor=#E9E9E9
| 594044 ||  || — || October 13, 2005 || Kitt Peak || Spacewatch ||  || align=right data-sort-value="0.83" | 830 m || 
|-id=045 bgcolor=#E9E9E9
| 594045 ||  || — || May 19, 2012 || Mount Lemmon || Mount Lemmon Survey ||  || align=right data-sort-value="0.77" | 770 m || 
|-id=046 bgcolor=#fefefe
| 594046 ||  || — || December 2, 2010 || Mount Lemmon || Mount Lemmon Survey ||  || align=right data-sort-value="0.94" | 940 m || 
|-id=047 bgcolor=#E9E9E9
| 594047 ||  || — || February 10, 2011 || Mount Lemmon || Mount Lemmon Survey ||  || align=right data-sort-value="0.75" | 750 m || 
|-id=048 bgcolor=#E9E9E9
| 594048 ||  || — || March 6, 2016 || Haleakala || Pan-STARRS ||  || align=right data-sort-value="0.81" | 810 m || 
|-id=049 bgcolor=#fefefe
| 594049 ||  || — || November 10, 2010 || Mount Lemmon || Mount Lemmon Survey ||  || align=right data-sort-value="0.58" | 580 m || 
|-id=050 bgcolor=#E9E9E9
| 594050 ||  || — || March 7, 2016 || Haleakala || Pan-STARRS ||  || align=right data-sort-value="0.72" | 720 m || 
|-id=051 bgcolor=#fefefe
| 594051 ||  || — || March 10, 2016 || Haleakala || Pan-STARRS ||  || align=right data-sort-value="0.59" | 590 m || 
|-id=052 bgcolor=#E9E9E9
| 594052 ||  || — || March 5, 2016 || Haleakala || Pan-STARRS ||  || align=right data-sort-value="0.96" | 960 m || 
|-id=053 bgcolor=#fefefe
| 594053 ||  || — || October 6, 1999 || Kitt Peak || Spacewatch ||  || align=right data-sort-value="0.82" | 820 m || 
|-id=054 bgcolor=#fefefe
| 594054 ||  || — || September 10, 2007 || Mount Lemmon || Mount Lemmon Survey ||  || align=right data-sort-value="0.98" | 980 m || 
|-id=055 bgcolor=#E9E9E9
| 594055 ||  || — || September 7, 2004 || Kitt Peak || Spacewatch ||  || align=right data-sort-value="0.97" | 970 m || 
|-id=056 bgcolor=#fefefe
| 594056 ||  || — || February 5, 2016 || Haleakala || Pan-STARRS ||  || align=right data-sort-value="0.64" | 640 m || 
|-id=057 bgcolor=#fefefe
| 594057 ||  || — || February 2, 2009 || Catalina || CSS ||  || align=right data-sort-value="0.84" | 840 m || 
|-id=058 bgcolor=#fefefe
| 594058 ||  || — || August 31, 2014 || Kitt Peak || Spacewatch ||  || align=right data-sort-value="0.70" | 700 m || 
|-id=059 bgcolor=#fefefe
| 594059 ||  || — || August 14, 2013 || Haleakala || Pan-STARRS ||  || align=right data-sort-value="0.75" | 750 m || 
|-id=060 bgcolor=#fefefe
| 594060 ||  || — || April 1, 2005 || Kitt Peak || Spacewatch ||  || align=right data-sort-value="0.63" | 630 m || 
|-id=061 bgcolor=#fefefe
| 594061 ||  || — || January 10, 2008 || Mount Lemmon || Mount Lemmon Survey ||  || align=right data-sort-value="0.65" | 650 m || 
|-id=062 bgcolor=#fefefe
| 594062 ||  || — || August 24, 2003 || Cerro Tololo || Cerro Tololo Obs. ||  || align=right data-sort-value="0.55" | 550 m || 
|-id=063 bgcolor=#fefefe
| 594063 ||  || — || October 16, 2007 || Mount Lemmon || Mount Lemmon Survey ||  || align=right data-sort-value="0.60" | 600 m || 
|-id=064 bgcolor=#E9E9E9
| 594064 ||  || — || September 3, 2013 || Haleakala || Pan-STARRS ||  || align=right data-sort-value="0.72" | 720 m || 
|-id=065 bgcolor=#fefefe
| 594065 ||  || — || February 7, 2008 || Mount Lemmon || Mount Lemmon Survey ||  || align=right data-sort-value="0.69" | 690 m || 
|-id=066 bgcolor=#E9E9E9
| 594066 ||  || — || January 6, 2012 || Haleakala || Pan-STARRS ||  || align=right data-sort-value="0.85" | 850 m || 
|-id=067 bgcolor=#fefefe
| 594067 ||  || — || July 15, 2013 || Haleakala || Pan-STARRS ||  || align=right data-sort-value="0.60" | 600 m || 
|-id=068 bgcolor=#E9E9E9
| 594068 ||  || — || April 24, 2012 || Mount Lemmon || Mount Lemmon Survey ||  || align=right data-sort-value="0.79" | 790 m || 
|-id=069 bgcolor=#E9E9E9
| 594069 ||  || — || October 14, 2013 || Mount Lemmon || Mount Lemmon Survey ||  || align=right data-sort-value="0.98" | 980 m || 
|-id=070 bgcolor=#E9E9E9
| 594070 ||  || — || September 28, 2013 || Mount Lemmon || Mount Lemmon Survey ||  || align=right | 1.2 km || 
|-id=071 bgcolor=#E9E9E9
| 594071 ||  || — || May 21, 2012 || Mount Lemmon || Mount Lemmon Survey ||  || align=right | 1.2 km || 
|-id=072 bgcolor=#fefefe
| 594072 ||  || — || March 13, 2012 || Mount Lemmon || Mount Lemmon Survey ||  || align=right data-sort-value="0.94" | 940 m || 
|-id=073 bgcolor=#E9E9E9
| 594073 ||  || — || April 27, 2012 || Kitt Peak || Spacewatch ||  || align=right data-sort-value="0.97" | 970 m || 
|-id=074 bgcolor=#C2FFFF
| 594074 ||  || — || October 17, 2010 || Mount Lemmon || Mount Lemmon Survey || L4 || align=right | 8.7 km || 
|-id=075 bgcolor=#E9E9E9
| 594075 ||  || — || March 19, 2016 || Haleakala || Pan-STARRS ||  || align=right | 1.4 km || 
|-id=076 bgcolor=#E9E9E9
| 594076 ||  || — || March 17, 2016 || Haleakala || Pan-STARRS ||  || align=right data-sort-value="0.85" | 850 m || 
|-id=077 bgcolor=#fefefe
| 594077 ||  || — || March 23, 2012 || Mount Lemmon || Mount Lemmon Survey ||  || align=right data-sort-value="0.74" | 740 m || 
|-id=078 bgcolor=#fefefe
| 594078 ||  || — || April 21, 2009 || Mount Lemmon || Mount Lemmon Survey ||  || align=right data-sort-value="0.66" | 660 m || 
|-id=079 bgcolor=#fefefe
| 594079 ||  || — || March 10, 2016 || Haleakala || Pan-STARRS ||  || align=right data-sort-value="0.61" | 610 m || 
|-id=080 bgcolor=#fefefe
| 594080 ||  || — || October 23, 2006 || Catalina || CSS ||  || align=right | 1.3 km || 
|-id=081 bgcolor=#fefefe
| 594081 ||  || — || October 2, 1992 || Kitt Peak || Spacewatch ||  || align=right data-sort-value="0.61" | 610 m || 
|-id=082 bgcolor=#fefefe
| 594082 ||  || — || October 10, 2006 || Palomar || NEAT ||  || align=right | 1.0 km || 
|-id=083 bgcolor=#E9E9E9
| 594083 ||  || — || March 27, 2012 || Kitt Peak || Spacewatch ||  || align=right data-sort-value="0.69" | 690 m || 
|-id=084 bgcolor=#fefefe
| 594084 ||  || — || July 14, 2013 || Haleakala || Pan-STARRS ||  || align=right data-sort-value="0.61" | 610 m || 
|-id=085 bgcolor=#fefefe
| 594085 ||  || — || November 9, 2007 || Kitt Peak || Spacewatch ||  || align=right data-sort-value="0.52" | 520 m || 
|-id=086 bgcolor=#fefefe
| 594086 ||  || — || January 13, 2015 || Haleakala || Pan-STARRS ||  || align=right data-sort-value="0.64" | 640 m || 
|-id=087 bgcolor=#fefefe
| 594087 ||  || — || January 27, 2012 || Mount Lemmon || Mount Lemmon Survey ||  || align=right data-sort-value="0.52" | 520 m || 
|-id=088 bgcolor=#fefefe
| 594088 ||  || — || April 1, 2016 || Haleakala || Pan-STARRS ||  || align=right data-sort-value="0.65" | 650 m || 
|-id=089 bgcolor=#E9E9E9
| 594089 ||  || — || April 27, 2012 || Haleakala || Pan-STARRS ||  || align=right data-sort-value="0.73" | 730 m || 
|-id=090 bgcolor=#E9E9E9
| 594090 ||  || — || December 25, 2010 || Mount Lemmon || Mount Lemmon Survey ||  || align=right data-sort-value="0.80" | 800 m || 
|-id=091 bgcolor=#E9E9E9
| 594091 ||  || — || February 16, 2007 || Mount Lemmon || Mount Lemmon Survey ||  || align=right | 1.2 km || 
|-id=092 bgcolor=#E9E9E9
| 594092 ||  || — || January 27, 2007 || Mount Lemmon || Mount Lemmon Survey || JUN || align=right data-sort-value="0.65" | 650 m || 
|-id=093 bgcolor=#fefefe
| 594093 ||  || — || May 16, 2009 || Mount Lemmon || Mount Lemmon Survey ||  || align=right data-sort-value="0.72" | 720 m || 
|-id=094 bgcolor=#fefefe
| 594094 ||  || — || August 31, 2014 || Haleakala || Pan-STARRS ||  || align=right data-sort-value="0.79" | 790 m || 
|-id=095 bgcolor=#fefefe
| 594095 ||  || — || January 13, 2008 || Kitt Peak || Spacewatch ||  || align=right data-sort-value="0.99" | 990 m || 
|-id=096 bgcolor=#C2FFFF
| 594096 ||  || — || February 16, 2015 || Haleakala || Pan-STARRS || L4 || align=right | 6.6 km || 
|-id=097 bgcolor=#fefefe
| 594097 ||  || — || April 10, 2002 || Palomar || NEAT ||  || align=right data-sort-value="0.92" | 920 m || 
|-id=098 bgcolor=#fefefe
| 594098 ||  || — || June 10, 2013 || Mount Lemmon || Mount Lemmon Survey ||  || align=right data-sort-value="0.79" | 790 m || 
|-id=099 bgcolor=#fefefe
| 594099 ||  || — || March 1, 2012 || Mount Lemmon || Mount Lemmon Survey ||  || align=right data-sort-value="0.67" | 670 m || 
|-id=100 bgcolor=#fefefe
| 594100 ||  || — || April 11, 2005 || Mount Lemmon || Mount Lemmon Survey ||  || align=right | 1.0 km || 
|}

594101–594200 

|-bgcolor=#fefefe
| 594101 ||  || — || August 30, 2014 || Haleakala || Pan-STARRS ||  || align=right data-sort-value="0.67" | 670 m || 
|-id=102 bgcolor=#fefefe
| 594102 ||  || — || December 3, 2014 || Haleakala || Pan-STARRS ||  || align=right data-sort-value="0.91" | 910 m || 
|-id=103 bgcolor=#E9E9E9
| 594103 ||  || — || March 5, 2000 || Cerro Tololo || D. Team ||  || align=right data-sort-value="0.78" | 780 m || 
|-id=104 bgcolor=#E9E9E9
| 594104 ||  || — || March 29, 2008 || Kitt Peak || Spacewatch ||  || align=right data-sort-value="0.76" | 760 m || 
|-id=105 bgcolor=#E9E9E9
| 594105 ||  || — || January 19, 2007 || Mauna Kea || Mauna Kea Obs. ||  || align=right data-sort-value="0.63" | 630 m || 
|-id=106 bgcolor=#fefefe
| 594106 ||  || — || November 17, 2006 || Mount Lemmon || Mount Lemmon Survey ||  || align=right | 1.1 km || 
|-id=107 bgcolor=#fefefe
| 594107 ||  || — || January 10, 2008 || Mount Lemmon || Mount Lemmon Survey ||  || align=right data-sort-value="0.87" | 870 m || 
|-id=108 bgcolor=#fefefe
| 594108 ||  || — || November 27, 2014 || Haleakala || Pan-STARRS ||  || align=right data-sort-value="0.73" | 730 m || 
|-id=109 bgcolor=#C2FFFF
| 594109 ||  || — || November 2, 2010 || Mount Lemmon || Mount Lemmon Survey || L4 || align=right | 7.2 km || 
|-id=110 bgcolor=#fefefe
| 594110 ||  || — || February 3, 2008 || Kitt Peak || Spacewatch ||  || align=right data-sort-value="0.69" | 690 m || 
|-id=111 bgcolor=#E9E9E9
| 594111 ||  || — || April 21, 2012 || Haleakala || Pan-STARRS ||  || align=right data-sort-value="0.75" | 750 m || 
|-id=112 bgcolor=#E9E9E9
| 594112 ||  || — || May 21, 2012 || Haleakala || Pan-STARRS ||  || align=right data-sort-value="0.77" | 770 m || 
|-id=113 bgcolor=#E9E9E9
| 594113 ||  || — || May 25, 2003 || Kitt Peak || Spacewatch ||  || align=right | 1.1 km || 
|-id=114 bgcolor=#E9E9E9
| 594114 ||  || — || March 11, 2007 || Kitt Peak || Spacewatch ||  || align=right | 1.1 km || 
|-id=115 bgcolor=#E9E9E9
| 594115 ||  || — || February 7, 2007 || Mount Lemmon || Mount Lemmon Survey ||  || align=right data-sort-value="0.98" | 980 m || 
|-id=116 bgcolor=#fefefe
| 594116 ||  || — || February 24, 2012 || Mount Lemmon || Mount Lemmon Survey ||  || align=right data-sort-value="0.61" | 610 m || 
|-id=117 bgcolor=#fefefe
| 594117 ||  || — || April 4, 2016 || Mount Lemmon || Mount Lemmon Survey ||  || align=right data-sort-value="0.79" | 790 m || 
|-id=118 bgcolor=#fefefe
| 594118 ||  || — || August 16, 2009 || La Sagra || OAM Obs. ||  || align=right data-sort-value="0.99" | 990 m || 
|-id=119 bgcolor=#fefefe
| 594119 ||  || — || June 13, 2005 || Mount Lemmon || Mount Lemmon Survey ||  || align=right data-sort-value="0.74" | 740 m || 
|-id=120 bgcolor=#E9E9E9
| 594120 ||  || — || July 27, 2004 || Siding Spring || SSS ||  || align=right | 1.3 km || 
|-id=121 bgcolor=#fefefe
| 594121 ||  || — || October 31, 2010 || Mount Lemmon || Mount Lemmon Survey ||  || align=right data-sort-value="0.61" | 610 m || 
|-id=122 bgcolor=#fefefe
| 594122 ||  || — || March 13, 2012 || Mount Lemmon || Mount Lemmon Survey ||  || align=right data-sort-value="0.58" | 580 m || 
|-id=123 bgcolor=#fefefe
| 594123 ||  || — || February 28, 2012 || Haleakala || Pan-STARRS ||  || align=right data-sort-value="0.77" | 770 m || 
|-id=124 bgcolor=#E9E9E9
| 594124 ||  || — || January 8, 2011 || Mount Lemmon || Mount Lemmon Survey ||  || align=right data-sort-value="0.85" | 850 m || 
|-id=125 bgcolor=#E9E9E9
| 594125 ||  || — || April 14, 2016 || Haleakala || Pan-STARRS ||  || align=right | 1.3 km || 
|-id=126 bgcolor=#C2FFFF
| 594126 ||  || — || March 31, 2003 || Apache Point || SDSS Collaboration || L4 || align=right | 8.5 km || 
|-id=127 bgcolor=#E9E9E9
| 594127 ||  || — || April 14, 2016 || Haleakala || Pan-STARRS ||  || align=right data-sort-value="0.98" | 980 m || 
|-id=128 bgcolor=#E9E9E9
| 594128 ||  || — || May 8, 2008 || Kitt Peak || Spacewatch ||  || align=right data-sort-value="0.93" | 930 m || 
|-id=129 bgcolor=#fefefe
| 594129 ||  || — || February 15, 2012 || Haleakala || Pan-STARRS ||  || align=right data-sort-value="0.68" | 680 m || 
|-id=130 bgcolor=#fefefe
| 594130 ||  || — || October 17, 2010 || Mount Lemmon || Mount Lemmon Survey ||  || align=right data-sort-value="0.63" | 630 m || 
|-id=131 bgcolor=#E9E9E9
| 594131 ||  || — || October 22, 2005 || Kitt Peak || Spacewatch ||  || align=right data-sort-value="0.77" | 770 m || 
|-id=132 bgcolor=#E9E9E9
| 594132 ||  || — || October 5, 2013 || Mount Lemmon || Mount Lemmon Survey ||  || align=right data-sort-value="0.72" | 720 m || 
|-id=133 bgcolor=#E9E9E9
| 594133 ||  || — || April 26, 2007 || Mount Lemmon || Mount Lemmon Survey ||  || align=right | 1.8 km || 
|-id=134 bgcolor=#E9E9E9
| 594134 ||  || — || April 29, 2012 || Kitt Peak || Spacewatch ||  || align=right data-sort-value="0.67" | 670 m || 
|-id=135 bgcolor=#E9E9E9
| 594135 ||  || — || April 5, 2016 || Haleakala || Pan-STARRS ||  || align=right | 1.4 km || 
|-id=136 bgcolor=#E9E9E9
| 594136 ||  || — || March 10, 2007 || Mount Lemmon || Mount Lemmon Survey ||  || align=right | 1.1 km || 
|-id=137 bgcolor=#E9E9E9
| 594137 ||  || — || January 20, 2015 || Mount Lemmon || Mount Lemmon Survey ||  || align=right data-sort-value="0.98" | 980 m || 
|-id=138 bgcolor=#E9E9E9
| 594138 ||  || — || April 5, 2016 || Haleakala || Pan-STARRS ||  || align=right | 1.1 km || 
|-id=139 bgcolor=#E9E9E9
| 594139 ||  || — || August 26, 2000 || Kitt Peak || Spacewatch ||  || align=right data-sort-value="0.81" | 810 m || 
|-id=140 bgcolor=#E9E9E9
| 594140 ||  || — || April 5, 2016 || Haleakala || Pan-STARRS ||  || align=right | 1.4 km || 
|-id=141 bgcolor=#E9E9E9
| 594141 ||  || — || April 14, 2016 || Haleakala || Pan-STARRS ||  || align=right data-sort-value="0.74" | 740 m || 
|-id=142 bgcolor=#fefefe
| 594142 ||  || — || April 1, 2016 || Mount Lemmon || Mount Lemmon Survey ||  || align=right data-sort-value="0.56" | 560 m || 
|-id=143 bgcolor=#fefefe
| 594143 ||  || — || November 29, 2014 || Kitt Peak || Spacewatch ||  || align=right data-sort-value="0.69" | 690 m || 
|-id=144 bgcolor=#E9E9E9
| 594144 ||  || — || April 5, 2016 || Haleakala || Pan-STARRS ||  || align=right | 1.0 km || 
|-id=145 bgcolor=#E9E9E9
| 594145 ||  || — || May 16, 2012 || Mount Lemmon || Mount Lemmon Survey ||  || align=right data-sort-value="0.87" | 870 m || 
|-id=146 bgcolor=#fefefe
| 594146 ||  || — || February 2, 2012 || Bergisch Gladbach || W. Bickel ||  || align=right data-sort-value="0.85" | 850 m || 
|-id=147 bgcolor=#E9E9E9
| 594147 ||  || — || February 3, 1995 || Kitt Peak || Spacewatch ||  || align=right data-sort-value="0.96" | 960 m || 
|-id=148 bgcolor=#E9E9E9
| 594148 ||  || — || July 30, 2000 || Cerro Tololo || M. W. Buie, S. D. Kern ||  || align=right | 1.0 km || 
|-id=149 bgcolor=#fefefe
| 594149 ||  || — || February 27, 2012 || Catalina || CSS ||  || align=right data-sort-value="0.92" | 920 m || 
|-id=150 bgcolor=#C2FFFF
| 594150 ||  || — || March 25, 2015 || Haleakala || Pan-STARRS || L4 || align=right | 7.5 km || 
|-id=151 bgcolor=#E9E9E9
| 594151 ||  || — || March 6, 2016 || Haleakala || Pan-STARRS ||  || align=right data-sort-value="0.89" | 890 m || 
|-id=152 bgcolor=#E9E9E9
| 594152 ||  || — || March 5, 2016 || Haleakala || Pan-STARRS ||  || align=right data-sort-value="0.75" | 750 m || 
|-id=153 bgcolor=#E9E9E9
| 594153 ||  || — || December 29, 2014 || Haleakala || Pan-STARRS ||  || align=right | 1.2 km || 
|-id=154 bgcolor=#E9E9E9
| 594154 ||  || — || February 10, 2016 || Haleakala || Pan-STARRS ||  || align=right data-sort-value="0.99" | 990 m || 
|-id=155 bgcolor=#E9E9E9
| 594155 ||  || — || March 17, 2016 || Haleakala || Pan-STARRS ||  || align=right | 1.6 km || 
|-id=156 bgcolor=#E9E9E9
| 594156 ||  || — || May 21, 2012 || Mount Lemmon || Mount Lemmon Survey ||  || align=right data-sort-value="0.95" | 950 m || 
|-id=157 bgcolor=#fefefe
| 594157 ||  || — || January 29, 2012 || Mount Lemmon || Mount Lemmon Survey ||  || align=right data-sort-value="0.75" | 750 m || 
|-id=158 bgcolor=#E9E9E9
| 594158 ||  || — || September 21, 2009 || Catalina || CSS ||  || align=right data-sort-value="0.99" | 990 m || 
|-id=159 bgcolor=#E9E9E9
| 594159 ||  || — || March 4, 2016 || Haleakala || Pan-STARRS ||  || align=right | 1.3 km || 
|-id=160 bgcolor=#E9E9E9
| 594160 ||  || — || May 19, 2004 || Kitt Peak || Spacewatch ||  || align=right data-sort-value="0.92" | 920 m || 
|-id=161 bgcolor=#E9E9E9
| 594161 ||  || — || May 18, 2012 || Mount Lemmon || Mount Lemmon Survey ||  || align=right data-sort-value="0.85" | 850 m || 
|-id=162 bgcolor=#fefefe
| 594162 ||  || — || February 27, 2012 || Haleakala || Pan-STARRS ||  || align=right data-sort-value="0.70" | 700 m || 
|-id=163 bgcolor=#E9E9E9
| 594163 ||  || — || October 28, 2005 || Mount Lemmon || Mount Lemmon Survey ||  || align=right data-sort-value="0.99" | 990 m || 
|-id=164 bgcolor=#fefefe
| 594164 ||  || — || September 25, 2006 || Mount Lemmon || Mount Lemmon Survey ||  || align=right data-sort-value="0.85" | 850 m || 
|-id=165 bgcolor=#E9E9E9
| 594165 ||  || — || October 12, 2005 || Kitt Peak || Spacewatch ||  || align=right | 1.6 km || 
|-id=166 bgcolor=#E9E9E9
| 594166 ||  || — || April 21, 2003 || Kitt Peak || Spacewatch ||  || align=right data-sort-value="0.99" | 990 m || 
|-id=167 bgcolor=#E9E9E9
| 594167 ||  || — || May 20, 2012 || Mount Lemmon || Mount Lemmon Survey ||  || align=right data-sort-value="0.97" | 970 m || 
|-id=168 bgcolor=#E9E9E9
| 594168 ||  || — || July 18, 2012 || Catalina || CSS ||  || align=right | 1.3 km || 
|-id=169 bgcolor=#E9E9E9
| 594169 ||  || — || April 4, 2016 || Haleakala || Pan-STARRS ||  || align=right data-sort-value="0.85" | 850 m || 
|-id=170 bgcolor=#E9E9E9
| 594170 ||  || — || May 3, 2016 || Mount Lemmon || Mount Lemmon Survey ||  || align=right data-sort-value="0.75" | 750 m || 
|-id=171 bgcolor=#E9E9E9
| 594171 ||  || — || September 3, 2013 || Haleakala || Pan-STARRS ||  || align=right data-sort-value="0.88" | 880 m || 
|-id=172 bgcolor=#E9E9E9
| 594172 ||  || — || May 6, 2016 || Haleakala || Pan-STARRS ||  || align=right | 1.2 km || 
|-id=173 bgcolor=#E9E9E9
| 594173 ||  || — || May 15, 2016 || Haleakala || Pan-STARRS ||  || align=right data-sort-value="0.96" | 960 m || 
|-id=174 bgcolor=#E9E9E9
| 594174 ||  || — || May 6, 2016 || Haleakala || Pan-STARRS ||  || align=right data-sort-value="0.72" | 720 m || 
|-id=175 bgcolor=#E9E9E9
| 594175 ||  || — || August 25, 2004 || Kitt Peak || Spacewatch ||  || align=right data-sort-value="0.75" | 750 m || 
|-id=176 bgcolor=#E9E9E9
| 594176 ||  || — || May 3, 2016 || Haleakala || Pan-STARRS ||  || align=right | 1.4 km || 
|-id=177 bgcolor=#E9E9E9
| 594177 ||  || — || March 18, 2016 || Haleakala || Pan-STARRS ||  || align=right | 1.1 km || 
|-id=178 bgcolor=#E9E9E9
| 594178 ||  || — || November 26, 2014 || Haleakala || Pan-STARRS ||  || align=right | 1.5 km || 
|-id=179 bgcolor=#E9E9E9
| 594179 ||  || — || December 28, 2014 || Mount Lemmon || Mount Lemmon Survey ||  || align=right data-sort-value="0.75" | 750 m || 
|-id=180 bgcolor=#E9E9E9
| 594180 ||  || — || September 14, 2007 || Catalina || CSS ||  || align=right | 2.0 km || 
|-id=181 bgcolor=#E9E9E9
| 594181 ||  || — || October 3, 2013 || Mount Lemmon || Mount Lemmon Survey ||  || align=right | 1.2 km || 
|-id=182 bgcolor=#C2FFFF
| 594182 ||  || — || January 12, 2013 || Bergisch Gladbach || W. Bickel || L4 || align=right | 7.8 km || 
|-id=183 bgcolor=#E9E9E9
| 594183 ||  || — || April 11, 2016 || Haleakala || Pan-STARRS ||  || align=right data-sort-value="0.74" | 740 m || 
|-id=184 bgcolor=#E9E9E9
| 594184 ||  || — || June 14, 2012 || Mount Lemmon || Mount Lemmon Survey ||  || align=right | 1.2 km || 
|-id=185 bgcolor=#C2FFFF
| 594185 ||  || — || February 16, 2005 || La Silla || A. Boattini || L4 || align=right | 10 km || 
|-id=186 bgcolor=#E9E9E9
| 594186 ||  || — || May 13, 2012 || Mount Lemmon || Mount Lemmon Survey ||  || align=right | 1.0 km || 
|-id=187 bgcolor=#E9E9E9
| 594187 ||  || — || January 22, 2015 || Haleakala || Pan-STARRS ||  || align=right data-sort-value="0.72" | 720 m || 
|-id=188 bgcolor=#E9E9E9
| 594188 ||  || — || March 20, 2015 || Haleakala || Pan-STARRS ||  || align=right | 1.4 km || 
|-id=189 bgcolor=#E9E9E9
| 594189 ||  || — || October 23, 2013 || Mount Lemmon || Mount Lemmon Survey ||  || align=right data-sort-value="0.82" | 820 m || 
|-id=190 bgcolor=#E9E9E9
| 594190 ||  || — || March 12, 2007 || Catalina || CSS ||  || align=right | 1.8 km || 
|-id=191 bgcolor=#E9E9E9
| 594191 ||  || — || June 5, 2016 || Haleakala || Pan-STARRS ||  || align=right | 1.2 km || 
|-id=192 bgcolor=#E9E9E9
| 594192 ||  || — || June 5, 2016 || Haleakala || Pan-STARRS ||  || align=right data-sort-value="0.96" | 960 m || 
|-id=193 bgcolor=#E9E9E9
| 594193 ||  || — || September 14, 2013 || Haleakala || Pan-STARRS ||  || align=right data-sort-value="0.63" | 630 m || 
|-id=194 bgcolor=#E9E9E9
| 594194 ||  || — || June 5, 2016 || Haleakala || Pan-STARRS ||  || align=right | 1.5 km || 
|-id=195 bgcolor=#E9E9E9
| 594195 ||  || — || May 30, 2016 || Haleakala || Pan-STARRS ||  || align=right | 1.2 km || 
|-id=196 bgcolor=#E9E9E9
| 594196 ||  || — || June 2, 2016 || Mount Lemmon || Mount Lemmon Survey ||  || align=right | 1.00 km || 
|-id=197 bgcolor=#E9E9E9
| 594197 ||  || — || June 7, 2016 || Haleakala || Pan-STARRS ||  || align=right data-sort-value="0.81" | 810 m || 
|-id=198 bgcolor=#E9E9E9
| 594198 ||  || — || August 26, 2012 || Siding Spring || SSS ||  || align=right | 1.7 km || 
|-id=199 bgcolor=#E9E9E9
| 594199 ||  || — || March 2, 2006 || Kitt Peak || Spacewatch ||  || align=right | 1.7 km || 
|-id=200 bgcolor=#E9E9E9
| 594200 ||  || — || December 6, 2008 || Kitt Peak || Spacewatch ||  || align=right | 2.2 km || 
|}

594201–594300 

|-bgcolor=#E9E9E9
| 594201 ||  || — || June 8, 2016 || Haleakala || Pan-STARRS ||  || align=right data-sort-value="0.94" | 940 m || 
|-id=202 bgcolor=#E9E9E9
| 594202 ||  || — || June 9, 2016 || Haleakala || Pan-STARRS ||  || align=right | 1.3 km || 
|-id=203 bgcolor=#E9E9E9
| 594203 ||  || — || January 17, 2015 || Haleakala || Pan-STARRS ||  || align=right | 1.2 km || 
|-id=204 bgcolor=#E9E9E9
| 594204 ||  || — || September 16, 2012 || Kitt Peak || Spacewatch ||  || align=right | 1.8 km || 
|-id=205 bgcolor=#E9E9E9
| 594205 ||  || — || November 6, 2008 || Kitt Peak || Spacewatch ||  || align=right | 1.5 km || 
|-id=206 bgcolor=#E9E9E9
| 594206 ||  || — || September 21, 2012 || Mount Lemmon || Mount Lemmon Survey ||  || align=right | 1.8 km || 
|-id=207 bgcolor=#E9E9E9
| 594207 ||  || — || May 6, 2011 || Kitt Peak || Spacewatch ||  || align=right | 1.7 km || 
|-id=208 bgcolor=#E9E9E9
| 594208 ||  || — || February 1, 2003 || Palomar || NEAT ||  || align=right | 1.3 km || 
|-id=209 bgcolor=#E9E9E9
| 594209 ||  || — || June 8, 2016 || Mount Lemmon || Mount Lemmon Survey ||  || align=right data-sort-value="0.99" | 990 m || 
|-id=210 bgcolor=#E9E9E9
| 594210 ||  || — || November 9, 2013 || Mount Lemmon || Mount Lemmon Survey ||  || align=right data-sort-value="0.75" | 750 m || 
|-id=211 bgcolor=#E9E9E9
| 594211 ||  || — || June 2, 2016 || Mount Lemmon || Mount Lemmon Survey ||  || align=right data-sort-value="0.78" | 780 m || 
|-id=212 bgcolor=#E9E9E9
| 594212 ||  || — || June 23, 2016 || Haleakala || Pan-STARRS ||  || align=right | 1.4 km || 
|-id=213 bgcolor=#E9E9E9
| 594213 ||  || — || October 3, 2013 || Kitt Peak || Spacewatch ||  || align=right | 1.5 km || 
|-id=214 bgcolor=#E9E9E9
| 594214 ||  || — || July 3, 2016 || Space Surveillance || Space Surveillance Telescope ||  || align=right | 1.5 km || 
|-id=215 bgcolor=#E9E9E9
| 594215 ||  || — || September 29, 2008 || Mount Lemmon || Mount Lemmon Survey ||  || align=right | 1.8 km || 
|-id=216 bgcolor=#E9E9E9
| 594216 ||  || — || January 16, 2005 || Mauna Kea || Mauna Kea Obs. ||  || align=right | 1.8 km || 
|-id=217 bgcolor=#E9E9E9
| 594217 ||  || — || June 8, 2016 || Mount Lemmon || Mount Lemmon Survey ||  || align=right | 1.7 km || 
|-id=218 bgcolor=#E9E9E9
| 594218 ||  || — || April 1, 2003 || Palomar || NEAT ||  || align=right | 1.2 km || 
|-id=219 bgcolor=#fefefe
| 594219 ||  || — || June 16, 1996 || Kitt Peak || Spacewatch ||  || align=right data-sort-value="0.93" | 930 m || 
|-id=220 bgcolor=#E9E9E9
| 594220 ||  || — || September 14, 2012 || Catalina || CSS ||  || align=right | 1.5 km || 
|-id=221 bgcolor=#E9E9E9
| 594221 ||  || — || July 4, 2016 || Haleakala || Pan-STARRS ||  || align=right | 1.7 km || 
|-id=222 bgcolor=#E9E9E9
| 594222 ||  || — || May 8, 2011 || Mount Lemmon || Mount Lemmon Survey ||  || align=right | 1.5 km || 
|-id=223 bgcolor=#E9E9E9
| 594223 ||  || — || November 1, 2008 || Mount Lemmon || Mount Lemmon Survey ||  || align=right | 2.0 km || 
|-id=224 bgcolor=#E9E9E9
| 594224 ||  || — || January 16, 2015 || Haleakala || Pan-STARRS ||  || align=right data-sort-value="0.95" | 950 m || 
|-id=225 bgcolor=#E9E9E9
| 594225 ||  || — || July 15, 2012 || Mayhill-ISON || L. Elenin ||  || align=right | 1.8 km || 
|-id=226 bgcolor=#E9E9E9
| 594226 ||  || — || November 28, 2013 || Mount Lemmon || Mount Lemmon Survey ||  || align=right | 2.0 km || 
|-id=227 bgcolor=#E9E9E9
| 594227 ||  || — || October 1, 2003 || Kitt Peak || Spacewatch ||  || align=right | 1.5 km || 
|-id=228 bgcolor=#E9E9E9
| 594228 ||  || — || September 5, 2007 || Anderson Mesa || LONEOS ||  || align=right | 2.0 km || 
|-id=229 bgcolor=#d6d6d6
| 594229 ||  || — || November 19, 2007 || Kitt Peak || Spacewatch ||  || align=right | 2.0 km || 
|-id=230 bgcolor=#E9E9E9
| 594230 ||  || — || October 21, 2012 || Kitt Peak || Spacewatch ||  || align=right | 1.8 km || 
|-id=231 bgcolor=#E9E9E9
| 594231 ||  || — || December 24, 2013 || Mount Lemmon || Mount Lemmon Survey ||  || align=right | 1.3 km || 
|-id=232 bgcolor=#E9E9E9
| 594232 ||  || — || March 17, 2015 || Haleakala || Pan-STARRS ||  || align=right data-sort-value="0.89" | 890 m || 
|-id=233 bgcolor=#E9E9E9
| 594233 ||  || — || September 25, 2012 || Mount Lemmon || Mount Lemmon Survey ||  || align=right | 1.7 km || 
|-id=234 bgcolor=#E9E9E9
| 594234 ||  || — || October 8, 2012 || Kitt Peak || Spacewatch ||  || align=right | 1.4 km || 
|-id=235 bgcolor=#E9E9E9
| 594235 ||  || — || June 8, 2016 || Haleakala || Pan-STARRS ||  || align=right | 1.7 km || 
|-id=236 bgcolor=#E9E9E9
| 594236 ||  || — || November 23, 2003 || Kitt Peak || Spacewatch ||  || align=right | 2.2 km || 
|-id=237 bgcolor=#fefefe
| 594237 ||  || — || March 30, 2008 || Kitt Peak || Spacewatch || H || align=right data-sort-value="0.45" | 450 m || 
|-id=238 bgcolor=#E9E9E9
| 594238 ||  || — || January 28, 2015 || Haleakala || Pan-STARRS ||  || align=right | 1.9 km || 
|-id=239 bgcolor=#E9E9E9
| 594239 ||  || — || July 3, 2016 || Mount Lemmon || Mount Lemmon Survey ||  || align=right | 1.5 km || 
|-id=240 bgcolor=#E9E9E9
| 594240 ||  || — || September 18, 2007 || Goodricke-Pigott || R. A. Tucker ||  || align=right | 2.1 km || 
|-id=241 bgcolor=#E9E9E9
| 594241 ||  || — || October 17, 2012 || Haleakala || Pan-STARRS ||  || align=right | 1.5 km || 
|-id=242 bgcolor=#E9E9E9
| 594242 ||  || — || September 10, 2007 || Mount Lemmon || Mount Lemmon Survey ||  || align=right | 1.3 km || 
|-id=243 bgcolor=#E9E9E9
| 594243 ||  || — || July 11, 2016 || Haleakala || Pan-STARRS ||  || align=right | 1.6 km || 
|-id=244 bgcolor=#E9E9E9
| 594244 ||  || — || July 6, 2016 || Mount Lemmon || Mount Lemmon Survey ||  || align=right | 2.0 km || 
|-id=245 bgcolor=#E9E9E9
| 594245 ||  || — || January 15, 2009 || Kitt Peak || Spacewatch ||  || align=right | 1.8 km || 
|-id=246 bgcolor=#E9E9E9
| 594246 ||  || — || February 10, 2002 || Socorro || LINEAR ||  || align=right | 1.2 km || 
|-id=247 bgcolor=#E9E9E9
| 594247 ||  || — || November 26, 2012 || Mount Lemmon || Mount Lemmon Survey ||  || align=right | 1.8 km || 
|-id=248 bgcolor=#d6d6d6
| 594248 ||  || — || July 17, 2001 || Anderson Mesa || LONEOS ||  || align=right | 3.0 km || 
|-id=249 bgcolor=#E9E9E9
| 594249 ||  || — || April 24, 2015 || Haleakala || Pan-STARRS ||  || align=right | 1.6 km || 
|-id=250 bgcolor=#E9E9E9
| 594250 ||  || — || February 16, 2015 || Haleakala || Pan-STARRS ||  || align=right | 1.3 km || 
|-id=251 bgcolor=#E9E9E9
| 594251 ||  || — || September 26, 2012 || Nogales || M. Schwartz, P. R. Holvorcem ||  || align=right | 1.4 km || 
|-id=252 bgcolor=#E9E9E9
| 594252 ||  || — || July 3, 2016 || Mount Lemmon || Mount Lemmon Survey ||  || align=right | 1.7 km || 
|-id=253 bgcolor=#E9E9E9
| 594253 ||  || — || July 3, 2016 || Mount Lemmon || Mount Lemmon Survey ||  || align=right | 1.4 km || 
|-id=254 bgcolor=#E9E9E9
| 594254 ||  || — || July 1, 2016 || Haleakala || Pan-STARRS ||  || align=right data-sort-value="0.84" | 840 m || 
|-id=255 bgcolor=#E9E9E9
| 594255 ||  || — || July 14, 2016 || Haleakala || Pan-STARRS ||  || align=right | 1.2 km || 
|-id=256 bgcolor=#d6d6d6
| 594256 ||  || — || July 7, 2016 || Haleakala || Pan-STARRS ||  || align=right | 1.9 km || 
|-id=257 bgcolor=#E9E9E9
| 594257 ||  || — || June 21, 2012 || Mount Lemmon || Mount Lemmon Survey ||  || align=right | 1.2 km || 
|-id=258 bgcolor=#d6d6d6
| 594258 ||  || — || July 10, 2016 || Mount Lemmon || Mount Lemmon Survey ||  || align=right | 2.1 km || 
|-id=259 bgcolor=#E9E9E9
| 594259 ||  || — || June 8, 2007 || Kitt Peak || Spacewatch ||  || align=right | 1.3 km || 
|-id=260 bgcolor=#d6d6d6
| 594260 ||  || — || July 27, 2011 || Haleakala || Pan-STARRS ||  || align=right | 1.6 km || 
|-id=261 bgcolor=#d6d6d6
| 594261 ||  || — || September 3, 2005 || Palomar || NEAT ||  || align=right | 2.9 km || 
|-id=262 bgcolor=#E9E9E9
| 594262 ||  || — || April 3, 2011 || Siding Spring || SSS ||  || align=right | 2.7 km || 
|-id=263 bgcolor=#d6d6d6
| 594263 ||  || — || September 20, 2011 || Haleakala || Pan-STARRS ||  || align=right | 2.2 km || 
|-id=264 bgcolor=#E9E9E9
| 594264 ||  || — || October 18, 2012 || Haleakala || Pan-STARRS ||  || align=right | 1.5 km || 
|-id=265 bgcolor=#E9E9E9
| 594265 ||  || — || August 23, 2008 || Siding Spring || SSS ||  || align=right | 1.7 km || 
|-id=266 bgcolor=#E9E9E9
| 594266 ||  || — || August 2, 2016 || Haleakala || Pan-STARRS ||  || align=right | 1.8 km || 
|-id=267 bgcolor=#E9E9E9
| 594267 ||  || — || June 8, 2016 || Haleakala || Pan-STARRS ||  || align=right | 1.2 km || 
|-id=268 bgcolor=#E9E9E9
| 594268 ||  || — || March 25, 2015 || Haleakala || Pan-STARRS ||  || align=right | 1.5 km || 
|-id=269 bgcolor=#E9E9E9
| 594269 ||  || — || February 9, 2005 || Kitt Peak || Spacewatch ||  || align=right | 1.6 km || 
|-id=270 bgcolor=#E9E9E9
| 594270 ||  || — || January 5, 2010 || Kitt Peak || Spacewatch ||  || align=right | 1.6 km || 
|-id=271 bgcolor=#E9E9E9
| 594271 ||  || — || December 28, 2013 || Mayhill-ISON || L. Elenin ||  || align=right | 1.8 km || 
|-id=272 bgcolor=#E9E9E9
| 594272 ||  || — || December 23, 2000 || Kitt Peak || Spacewatch ||  || align=right | 1.2 km || 
|-id=273 bgcolor=#E9E9E9
| 594273 ||  || — || August 7, 2016 || Haleakala || Pan-STARRS ||  || align=right | 1.6 km || 
|-id=274 bgcolor=#E9E9E9
| 594274 ||  || — || February 9, 2005 || Mount Lemmon || Mount Lemmon Survey ||  || align=right | 1.7 km || 
|-id=275 bgcolor=#E9E9E9
| 594275 ||  || — || August 2, 2016 || Haleakala || Pan-STARRS ||  || align=right data-sort-value="0.80" | 800 m || 
|-id=276 bgcolor=#E9E9E9
| 594276 ||  || — || October 22, 2003 || Apache Point || SDSS Collaboration ||  || align=right | 1.7 km || 
|-id=277 bgcolor=#E9E9E9
| 594277 ||  || — || October 8, 2004 || Kitt Peak || Spacewatch ||  || align=right | 1.1 km || 
|-id=278 bgcolor=#d6d6d6
| 594278 ||  || — || April 20, 2010 || Mount Lemmon || Mount Lemmon Survey ||  || align=right | 2.0 km || 
|-id=279 bgcolor=#d6d6d6
| 594279 ||  || — || May 24, 2015 || Haleakala || Pan-STARRS ||  || align=right | 2.2 km || 
|-id=280 bgcolor=#E9E9E9
| 594280 ||  || — || October 22, 2009 || Kitt Peak || Spacewatch ||  || align=right | 1.1 km || 
|-id=281 bgcolor=#E9E9E9
| 594281 ||  || — || October 8, 2012 || Haleakala || Pan-STARRS ||  || align=right | 2.0 km || 
|-id=282 bgcolor=#E9E9E9
| 594282 ||  || — || March 25, 2007 || Mount Lemmon || Mount Lemmon Survey ||  || align=right | 1.1 km || 
|-id=283 bgcolor=#E9E9E9
| 594283 ||  || — || February 6, 2014 || Catalina || CSS ||  || align=right | 1.8 km || 
|-id=284 bgcolor=#E9E9E9
| 594284 ||  || — || September 21, 2012 || Kitt Peak || Spacewatch ||  || align=right | 1.9 km || 
|-id=285 bgcolor=#E9E9E9
| 594285 ||  || — || June 11, 2002 || Palomar || NEAT ||  || align=right | 2.3 km || 
|-id=286 bgcolor=#E9E9E9
| 594286 ||  || — || January 11, 2014 || Haleakala || Pan-STARRS ||  || align=right | 1.6 km || 
|-id=287 bgcolor=#d6d6d6
| 594287 ||  || — || May 1, 2008 || Siding Spring || SSS ||  || align=right | 4.5 km || 
|-id=288 bgcolor=#E9E9E9
| 594288 ||  || — || May 18, 2015 || Mount Lemmon || Mount Lemmon Survey ||  || align=right | 1.9 km || 
|-id=289 bgcolor=#d6d6d6
| 594289 ||  || — || September 2, 2011 || Haleakala || Pan-STARRS ||  || align=right | 2.3 km || 
|-id=290 bgcolor=#E9E9E9
| 594290 ||  || — || August 10, 2016 || Haleakala || Pan-STARRS ||  || align=right | 1.8 km || 
|-id=291 bgcolor=#d6d6d6
| 594291 ||  || — || September 4, 2011 || Haleakala || Pan-STARRS ||  || align=right | 1.6 km || 
|-id=292 bgcolor=#d6d6d6
| 594292 ||  || — || November 7, 2012 || Haleakala || Pan-STARRS ||  || align=right | 1.6 km || 
|-id=293 bgcolor=#d6d6d6
| 594293 ||  || — || April 6, 2008 || Mount Lemmon || Mount Lemmon Survey ||  || align=right | 2.5 km || 
|-id=294 bgcolor=#E9E9E9
| 594294 ||  || — || October 9, 2008 || Mount Lemmon || Mount Lemmon Survey ||  || align=right | 1.5 km || 
|-id=295 bgcolor=#E9E9E9
| 594295 ||  || — || January 26, 2009 || Mount Lemmon || Mount Lemmon Survey ||  || align=right | 1.6 km || 
|-id=296 bgcolor=#d6d6d6
| 594296 ||  || — || December 11, 2001 || Kitt Peak || Spacewatch ||  || align=right | 2.2 km || 
|-id=297 bgcolor=#E9E9E9
| 594297 ||  || — || August 24, 2007 || Kitt Peak || Spacewatch ||  || align=right | 1.6 km || 
|-id=298 bgcolor=#d6d6d6
| 594298 ||  || — || January 29, 2014 || Catalina || CSS ||  || align=right | 2.8 km || 
|-id=299 bgcolor=#d6d6d6
| 594299 ||  || — || September 21, 2011 || Mount Lemmon || Mount Lemmon Survey ||  || align=right | 2.4 km || 
|-id=300 bgcolor=#d6d6d6
| 594300 ||  || — || May 23, 2001 || Cerro Tololo || J. L. Elliot, L. H. Wasserman ||  || align=right | 2.0 km || 
|}

594301–594400 

|-bgcolor=#d6d6d6
| 594301 ||  || — || September 21, 2011 || Mount Lemmon || Mount Lemmon Survey ||  || align=right | 1.8 km || 
|-id=302 bgcolor=#E9E9E9
| 594302 ||  || — || November 7, 2012 || Haleakala || Pan-STARRS ||  || align=right | 2.0 km || 
|-id=303 bgcolor=#d6d6d6
| 594303 ||  || — || January 19, 2013 || Kitt Peak || Spacewatch ||  || align=right | 2.7 km || 
|-id=304 bgcolor=#d6d6d6
| 594304 ||  || — || October 31, 2011 || Mount Lemmon || Mount Lemmon Survey ||  || align=right | 2.3 km || 
|-id=305 bgcolor=#d6d6d6
| 594305 ||  || — || August 12, 2016 || Haleakala || Pan-STARRS ||  || align=right | 2.6 km || 
|-id=306 bgcolor=#d6d6d6
| 594306 ||  || — || January 14, 2002 || Palomar || NEAT ||  || align=right | 2.1 km || 
|-id=307 bgcolor=#d6d6d6
| 594307 ||  || — || August 2, 2016 || Haleakala || Pan-STARRS ||  || align=right | 1.9 km || 
|-id=308 bgcolor=#d6d6d6
| 594308 ||  || — || August 2, 2016 || Haleakala || Pan-STARRS ||  || align=right | 2.1 km || 
|-id=309 bgcolor=#d6d6d6
| 594309 ||  || — || July 27, 2011 || Haleakala || Pan-STARRS ||  || align=right | 2.4 km || 
|-id=310 bgcolor=#d6d6d6
| 594310 ||  || — || October 21, 2006 || Mount Lemmon || Mount Lemmon Survey ||  || align=right | 2.1 km || 
|-id=311 bgcolor=#FA8072
| 594311 ||  || — || February 15, 2010 || Mount Lemmon || Mount Lemmon Survey || H || align=right data-sort-value="0.33" | 330 m || 
|-id=312 bgcolor=#E9E9E9
| 594312 ||  || — || October 19, 2003 || Apache Point || SDSS Collaboration ||  || align=right | 1.7 km || 
|-id=313 bgcolor=#E9E9E9
| 594313 ||  || — || October 15, 2012 || Kitt Peak || Spacewatch ||  || align=right | 3.1 km || 
|-id=314 bgcolor=#d6d6d6
| 594314 ||  || — || November 24, 2002 || Palomar || NEAT ||  || align=right | 2.1 km || 
|-id=315 bgcolor=#E9E9E9
| 594315 ||  || — || October 11, 2007 || Mount Lemmon || Mount Lemmon Survey ||  || align=right | 1.8 km || 
|-id=316 bgcolor=#d6d6d6
| 594316 ||  || — || August 2, 2011 || Haleakala || Pan-STARRS ||  || align=right | 2.2 km || 
|-id=317 bgcolor=#E9E9E9
| 594317 ||  || — || October 29, 2003 || Kitt Peak || Spacewatch ||  || align=right | 2.1 km || 
|-id=318 bgcolor=#E9E9E9
| 594318 ||  || — || December 29, 2008 || Mount Lemmon || Mount Lemmon Survey ||  || align=right | 1.9 km || 
|-id=319 bgcolor=#E9E9E9
| 594319 ||  || — || May 22, 2015 || Haleakala || Pan-STARRS ||  || align=right | 1.3 km || 
|-id=320 bgcolor=#E9E9E9
| 594320 ||  || — || September 19, 2012 || Mount Lemmon || Mount Lemmon Survey ||  || align=right | 2.0 km || 
|-id=321 bgcolor=#E9E9E9
| 594321 ||  || — || May 6, 2006 || Mount Lemmon || Mount Lemmon Survey ||  || align=right | 2.0 km || 
|-id=322 bgcolor=#E9E9E9
| 594322 ||  || — || February 18, 2015 || Haleakala || Pan-STARRS ||  || align=right | 2.2 km || 
|-id=323 bgcolor=#E9E9E9
| 594323 ||  || — || October 9, 2007 || Lulin || LUSS ||  || align=right | 1.9 km || 
|-id=324 bgcolor=#d6d6d6
| 594324 ||  || — || September 20, 2011 || Catalina || CSS ||  || align=right | 1.9 km || 
|-id=325 bgcolor=#d6d6d6
| 594325 ||  || — || August 28, 2016 || Mount Lemmon || Mount Lemmon Survey ||  || align=right | 1.9 km || 
|-id=326 bgcolor=#E9E9E9
| 594326 ||  || — || March 18, 2010 || Mount Lemmon || Mount Lemmon Survey ||  || align=right | 2.1 km || 
|-id=327 bgcolor=#E9E9E9
| 594327 ||  || — || August 10, 2007 || Kitt Peak || Spacewatch ||  || align=right | 1.8 km || 
|-id=328 bgcolor=#E9E9E9
| 594328 ||  || — || September 9, 2007 || Mount Lemmon || Mount Lemmon Survey ||  || align=right | 1.8 km || 
|-id=329 bgcolor=#fefefe
| 594329 ||  || — || November 11, 2013 || Mount Lemmon || Mount Lemmon Survey ||  || align=right data-sort-value="0.77" | 770 m || 
|-id=330 bgcolor=#E9E9E9
| 594330 ||  || — || April 11, 2005 || Mount Lemmon || Mount Lemmon Survey ||  || align=right | 2.3 km || 
|-id=331 bgcolor=#d6d6d6
| 594331 ||  || — || July 8, 2005 || Kitt Peak || Spacewatch ||  || align=right | 2.4 km || 
|-id=332 bgcolor=#E9E9E9
| 594332 ||  || — || March 18, 2015 || Haleakala || Pan-STARRS ||  || align=right | 1.3 km || 
|-id=333 bgcolor=#d6d6d6
| 594333 ||  || — || August 2, 2011 || Haleakala || Pan-STARRS ||  || align=right | 2.5 km || 
|-id=334 bgcolor=#E9E9E9
| 594334 ||  || — || July 4, 2011 || Siding Spring || SSS ||  || align=right | 2.8 km || 
|-id=335 bgcolor=#d6d6d6
| 594335 ||  || — || August 3, 2016 || Haleakala || Pan-STARRS ||  || align=right | 2.1 km || 
|-id=336 bgcolor=#E9E9E9
| 594336 ||  || — || December 18, 2009 || Mount Lemmon || Mount Lemmon Survey ||  || align=right | 1.9 km || 
|-id=337 bgcolor=#C2E0FF
| 594337 ||  || — || August 25, 2016 || Cerro Tololo-DECam || CTIO-DECam || SDO || align=right | 114 km || 
|-id=338 bgcolor=#d6d6d6
| 594338 ||  || — || August 27, 2005 || Palomar || NEAT ||  || align=right | 2.4 km || 
|-id=339 bgcolor=#E9E9E9
| 594339 ||  || — || October 23, 2012 || Haleakala || Pan-STARRS ||  || align=right | 1.3 km || 
|-id=340 bgcolor=#E9E9E9
| 594340 ||  || — || February 25, 2014 || Haleakala || Pan-STARRS ||  || align=right | 2.3 km || 
|-id=341 bgcolor=#d6d6d6
| 594341 ||  || — || December 25, 2006 || Kitt Peak || Spacewatch ||  || align=right | 3.1 km || 
|-id=342 bgcolor=#d6d6d6
| 594342 ||  || — || August 27, 2016 || Haleakala || Pan-STARRS ||  || align=right | 2.3 km || 
|-id=343 bgcolor=#fefefe
| 594343 ||  || — || August 30, 2016 || Mount Lemmon || Mount Lemmon Survey || H || align=right data-sort-value="0.31" | 310 m || 
|-id=344 bgcolor=#E9E9E9
| 594344 ||  || — || October 18, 2012 || Mount Lemmon || Mount Lemmon Survey ||  || align=right | 2.2 km || 
|-id=345 bgcolor=#d6d6d6
| 594345 ||  || — || August 26, 2011 || Piszkesteto || K. Sárneczky ||  || align=right | 2.5 km || 
|-id=346 bgcolor=#d6d6d6
| 594346 ||  || — || December 21, 2006 || Kitt Peak || Spacewatch ||  || align=right | 3.0 km || 
|-id=347 bgcolor=#E9E9E9
| 594347 ||  || — || October 8, 2007 || Mount Lemmon || Mount Lemmon Survey ||  || align=right | 1.4 km || 
|-id=348 bgcolor=#E9E9E9
| 594348 ||  || — || September 27, 2002 || Palomar || NEAT ||  || align=right | 2.1 km || 
|-id=349 bgcolor=#E9E9E9
| 594349 ||  || — || September 30, 2002 || Haleakala || AMOS ||  || align=right | 2.0 km || 
|-id=350 bgcolor=#d6d6d6
| 594350 ||  || — || August 27, 2011 || Haleakala || Pan-STARRS ||  || align=right | 2.2 km || 
|-id=351 bgcolor=#d6d6d6
| 594351 ||  || — || July 11, 2005 || Kitt Peak || Spacewatch ||  || align=right | 2.3 km || 
|-id=352 bgcolor=#d6d6d6
| 594352 ||  || — || December 22, 2012 || Haleakala || Pan-STARRS ||  || align=right | 2.2 km || 
|-id=353 bgcolor=#d6d6d6
| 594353 ||  || — || November 3, 2011 || Mount Lemmon || Mount Lemmon Survey ||  || align=right | 2.3 km || 
|-id=354 bgcolor=#fefefe
| 594354 ||  || — || September 19, 2011 || Haleakala || Pan-STARRS || H || align=right data-sort-value="0.43" | 430 m || 
|-id=355 bgcolor=#fefefe
| 594355 ||  || — || March 16, 2007 || Kitt Peak || Spacewatch || H || align=right data-sort-value="0.63" | 630 m || 
|-id=356 bgcolor=#d6d6d6
| 594356 ||  || — || January 4, 2013 || Cerro Tololo-DECam || CTIO-DECam ||  || align=right | 1.9 km || 
|-id=357 bgcolor=#fefefe
| 594357 ||  || — || September 3, 2016 || Mount Lemmon || Mount Lemmon Survey || H || align=right data-sort-value="0.62" | 620 m || 
|-id=358 bgcolor=#E9E9E9
| 594358 ||  || — || August 15, 2002 || Palomar || NEAT ||  || align=right | 2.7 km || 
|-id=359 bgcolor=#E9E9E9
| 594359 ||  || — || October 31, 2007 || Mount Lemmon || Mount Lemmon Survey ||  || align=right | 2.0 km || 
|-id=360 bgcolor=#fefefe
| 594360 ||  || — || March 16, 2007 || Kitt Peak || Spacewatch || H || align=right data-sort-value="0.45" | 450 m || 
|-id=361 bgcolor=#d6d6d6
| 594361 ||  || — || August 27, 2006 || Kitt Peak || Spacewatch ||  || align=right | 1.8 km || 
|-id=362 bgcolor=#d6d6d6
| 594362 ||  || — || September 17, 2010 || Mount Lemmon || Mount Lemmon Survey || 7:4* || align=right | 2.7 km || 
|-id=363 bgcolor=#d6d6d6
| 594363 ||  || — || October 30, 2011 || Mount Lemmon || Mount Lemmon Survey ||  || align=right | 2.5 km || 
|-id=364 bgcolor=#fefefe
| 594364 ||  || — || March 20, 2015 || Haleakala || Pan-STARRS || H || align=right data-sort-value="0.63" | 630 m || 
|-id=365 bgcolor=#E9E9E9
| 594365 ||  || — || November 7, 2007 || Catalina || CSS ||  || align=right | 2.3 km || 
|-id=366 bgcolor=#d6d6d6
| 594366 ||  || — || November 8, 2007 || Kitt Peak || Spacewatch ||  || align=right | 2.9 km || 
|-id=367 bgcolor=#d6d6d6
| 594367 ||  || — || April 17, 2009 || Kitt Peak || Spacewatch ||  || align=right | 2.0 km || 
|-id=368 bgcolor=#d6d6d6
| 594368 ||  || — || February 29, 2008 || Kitt Peak || Spacewatch ||  || align=right | 2.9 km || 
|-id=369 bgcolor=#d6d6d6
| 594369 ||  || — || October 21, 2011 || Kitt Peak || Spacewatch ||  || align=right | 1.7 km || 
|-id=370 bgcolor=#E9E9E9
| 594370 ||  || — || August 30, 2016 || Mount Lemmon || Mount Lemmon Survey ||  || align=right | 2.0 km || 
|-id=371 bgcolor=#d6d6d6
| 594371 ||  || — || September 25, 2016 || Haleakala || Pan-STARRS ||  || align=right | 2.1 km || 
|-id=372 bgcolor=#d6d6d6
| 594372 ||  || — || September 26, 2016 || Haleakala || Pan-STARRS ||  || align=right | 2.1 km || 
|-id=373 bgcolor=#E9E9E9
| 594373 ||  || — || September 28, 1997 || Kitt Peak || Spacewatch ||  || align=right | 2.6 km || 
|-id=374 bgcolor=#E9E9E9
| 594374 ||  || — || October 14, 2007 || Mount Lemmon || Mount Lemmon Survey ||  || align=right | 2.3 km || 
|-id=375 bgcolor=#d6d6d6
| 594375 ||  || — || April 10, 2013 || Haleakala || Pan-STARRS ||  || align=right | 3.3 km || 
|-id=376 bgcolor=#fefefe
| 594376 ||  || — || December 18, 2009 || Mount Lemmon || Mount Lemmon Survey || H || align=right data-sort-value="0.59" | 590 m || 
|-id=377 bgcolor=#d6d6d6
| 594377 ||  || — || July 29, 2000 || Cerro Tololo || M. W. Buie, S. D. Kern ||  || align=right | 2.0 km || 
|-id=378 bgcolor=#d6d6d6
| 594378 ||  || — || September 22, 2011 || Catalina || CSS ||  || align=right | 3.8 km || 
|-id=379 bgcolor=#d6d6d6
| 594379 ||  || — || October 25, 2011 || Haleakala || Pan-STARRS ||  || align=right | 2.3 km || 
|-id=380 bgcolor=#E9E9E9
| 594380 ||  || — || September 22, 2016 || Mount Lemmon || Mount Lemmon Survey ||  || align=right | 2.3 km || 
|-id=381 bgcolor=#E9E9E9
| 594381 ||  || — || May 2, 2006 || Mount Lemmon || Mount Lemmon Survey ||  || align=right | 1.4 km || 
|-id=382 bgcolor=#d6d6d6
| 594382 ||  || — || January 17, 2013 || Mount Lemmon || Mount Lemmon Survey ||  || align=right | 2.4 km || 
|-id=383 bgcolor=#d6d6d6
| 594383 ||  || — || May 22, 2015 || Haleakala || Pan-STARRS ||  || align=right | 2.0 km || 
|-id=384 bgcolor=#d6d6d6
| 594384 ||  || — || September 18, 2006 || Kitt Peak || Spacewatch ||  || align=right | 2.0 km || 
|-id=385 bgcolor=#d6d6d6
| 594385 ||  || — || August 30, 2005 || Kitt Peak || Spacewatch ||  || align=right | 1.8 km || 
|-id=386 bgcolor=#E9E9E9
| 594386 ||  || — || November 4, 2007 || Kitt Peak || Spacewatch ||  || align=right | 2.2 km || 
|-id=387 bgcolor=#d6d6d6
| 594387 ||  || — || December 13, 2006 || Mount Lemmon || Mount Lemmon Survey ||  || align=right | 2.3 km || 
|-id=388 bgcolor=#d6d6d6
| 594388 ||  || — || September 25, 2005 || Kitt Peak || Spacewatch ||  || align=right | 2.3 km || 
|-id=389 bgcolor=#d6d6d6
| 594389 ||  || — || April 29, 2008 || Mount Lemmon || Mount Lemmon Survey ||  || align=right | 3.5 km || 
|-id=390 bgcolor=#FA8072
| 594390 ||  || — || October 15, 2001 || Socorro || LINEAR || H || align=right data-sort-value="0.78" | 780 m || 
|-id=391 bgcolor=#d6d6d6
| 594391 ||  || — || December 28, 2006 || Piszkesteto || K. Sárneczky ||  || align=right | 2.8 km || 
|-id=392 bgcolor=#d6d6d6
| 594392 ||  || — || September 5, 2000 || Apache Point || SDSS Collaboration ||  || align=right | 1.9 km || 
|-id=393 bgcolor=#d6d6d6
| 594393 ||  || — || August 10, 2016 || Haleakala || Pan-STARRS ||  || align=right | 2.3 km || 
|-id=394 bgcolor=#fefefe
| 594394 ||  || — || March 31, 2008 || Kitt Peak || Spacewatch || H || align=right data-sort-value="0.51" | 510 m || 
|-id=395 bgcolor=#d6d6d6
| 594395 ||  || — || December 30, 2007 || Kitt Peak || Spacewatch ||  || align=right | 2.3 km || 
|-id=396 bgcolor=#E9E9E9
| 594396 ||  || — || February 11, 2013 || Nogales || M. Schwartz, P. R. Holvorcem ||  || align=right | 2.0 km || 
|-id=397 bgcolor=#E9E9E9
| 594397 ||  || — || October 10, 2007 || Mount Lemmon || Mount Lemmon Survey ||  || align=right | 2.0 km || 
|-id=398 bgcolor=#E9E9E9
| 594398 ||  || — || September 21, 2011 || Mount Lemmon || Mount Lemmon Survey ||  || align=right | 1.9 km || 
|-id=399 bgcolor=#d6d6d6
| 594399 ||  || — || May 2, 2008 || Catalina || CSS ||  || align=right | 3.4 km || 
|-id=400 bgcolor=#E9E9E9
| 594400 ||  || — || September 21, 2011 || Mount Lemmon || Mount Lemmon Survey ||  || align=right | 1.7 km || 
|}

594401–594500 

|-bgcolor=#d6d6d6
| 594401 ||  || — || March 13, 2013 || Palomar || PTF ||  || align=right | 2.6 km || 
|-id=402 bgcolor=#fefefe
| 594402 ||  || — || November 30, 2014 || Haleakala || Pan-STARRS || H || align=right data-sort-value="0.66" | 660 m || 
|-id=403 bgcolor=#d6d6d6
| 594403 ||  || — || August 4, 2005 || Palomar || NEAT ||  || align=right | 3.0 km || 
|-id=404 bgcolor=#E9E9E9
| 594404 ||  || — || October 21, 2007 || Mount Lemmon || Mount Lemmon Survey ||  || align=right | 1.7 km || 
|-id=405 bgcolor=#d6d6d6
| 594405 ||  || — || October 12, 2016 || Haleakala || Pan-STARRS ||  || align=right | 2.6 km || 
|-id=406 bgcolor=#d6d6d6
| 594406 ||  || — || October 12, 2016 || Mount Lemmon || Mount Lemmon Survey ||  || align=right | 2.7 km || 
|-id=407 bgcolor=#d6d6d6
| 594407 ||  || — || October 12, 2016 || Haleakala || Pan-STARRS ||  || align=right | 2.1 km || 
|-id=408 bgcolor=#d6d6d6
| 594408 ||  || — || October 8, 2016 || Haleakala || Pan-STARRS || 7:4 || align=right | 2.9 km || 
|-id=409 bgcolor=#fefefe
| 594409 ||  || — || September 23, 2011 || Kitt Peak || Spacewatch || H || align=right data-sort-value="0.57" | 570 m || 
|-id=410 bgcolor=#d6d6d6
| 594410 ||  || — || October 25, 2011 || Haleakala || Pan-STARRS ||  || align=right | 2.4 km || 
|-id=411 bgcolor=#d6d6d6
| 594411 ||  || — || February 29, 2008 || Kanab || E. E. Sheridan ||  || align=right | 2.2 km || 
|-id=412 bgcolor=#d6d6d6
| 594412 ||  || — || April 30, 2014 || Haleakala || Pan-STARRS ||  || align=right | 2.2 km || 
|-id=413 bgcolor=#d6d6d6
| 594413 ||  || — || October 11, 2016 || Mount Lemmon || Mount Lemmon Survey ||  || align=right | 2.1 km || 
|-id=414 bgcolor=#d6d6d6
| 594414 ||  || — || June 13, 2015 || Haleakala || Pan-STARRS ||  || align=right | 2.5 km || 
|-id=415 bgcolor=#E9E9E9
| 594415 ||  || — || October 11, 2016 || Mount Lemmon || Mount Lemmon Survey ||  || align=right | 1.8 km || 
|-id=416 bgcolor=#fefefe
| 594416 ||  || — || October 19, 2006 || Kitt Peak || Spacewatch || H || align=right data-sort-value="0.48" | 480 m || 
|-id=417 bgcolor=#d6d6d6
| 594417 ||  || — || August 25, 2000 || Cerro Tololo || R. Millis, L. H. Wasserman ||  || align=right | 1.9 km || 
|-id=418 bgcolor=#fefefe
| 594418 ||  || — || April 6, 2008 || Kitt Peak || Spacewatch || H || align=right data-sort-value="0.46" | 460 m || 
|-id=419 bgcolor=#d6d6d6
| 594419 ||  || — || July 4, 2005 || Mount Lemmon || Mount Lemmon Survey ||  || align=right | 2.4 km || 
|-id=420 bgcolor=#d6d6d6
| 594420 ||  || — || January 10, 2013 || Haleakala || Pan-STARRS ||  || align=right | 2.8 km || 
|-id=421 bgcolor=#d6d6d6
| 594421 ||  || — || November 22, 2011 || Mount Lemmon || Mount Lemmon Survey ||  || align=right | 2.7 km || 
|-id=422 bgcolor=#d6d6d6
| 594422 ||  || — || February 7, 2013 || Kitt Peak || Spacewatch ||  || align=right | 2.4 km || 
|-id=423 bgcolor=#d6d6d6
| 594423 ||  || — || April 16, 2013 || Cerro Tololo-DECam || CTIO-DECam ||  || align=right | 2.0 km || 
|-id=424 bgcolor=#d6d6d6
| 594424 ||  || — || August 1, 2005 || Mauna Kea || Mauna Kea Obs. ||  || align=right | 2.8 km || 
|-id=425 bgcolor=#d6d6d6
| 594425 ||  || — || October 20, 2011 || Mount Lemmon || Mount Lemmon Survey ||  || align=right | 2.2 km || 
|-id=426 bgcolor=#d6d6d6
| 594426 ||  || — || November 25, 2011 || Haleakala || Pan-STARRS ||  || align=right | 2.3 km || 
|-id=427 bgcolor=#E9E9E9
| 594427 ||  || — || February 24, 2014 || Haleakala || Pan-STARRS ||  || align=right | 2.4 km || 
|-id=428 bgcolor=#d6d6d6
| 594428 ||  || — || August 31, 2005 || Kitt Peak || Spacewatch ||  || align=right | 2.1 km || 
|-id=429 bgcolor=#d6d6d6
| 594429 ||  || — || October 10, 2016 || Oukaimeden || C. Rinner ||  || align=right | 2.4 km || 
|-id=430 bgcolor=#d6d6d6
| 594430 ||  || — || October 21, 2006 || Kitt Peak || Spacewatch ||  || align=right | 1.9 km || 
|-id=431 bgcolor=#d6d6d6
| 594431 ||  || — || August 26, 2005 || Palomar || NEAT ||  || align=right | 2.1 km || 
|-id=432 bgcolor=#d6d6d6
| 594432 ||  || — || October 13, 1999 || Apache Point || SDSS Collaboration ||  || align=right | 2.9 km || 
|-id=433 bgcolor=#E9E9E9
| 594433 ||  || — || March 16, 2010 || Kitt Peak || Spacewatch ||  || align=right | 1.5 km || 
|-id=434 bgcolor=#d6d6d6
| 594434 ||  || — || April 25, 2014 || Mount Lemmon || Mount Lemmon Survey ||  || align=right | 2.4 km || 
|-id=435 bgcolor=#d6d6d6
| 594435 ||  || — || October 10, 2016 || Mount Lemmon || Mount Lemmon Survey ||  || align=right | 2.1 km || 
|-id=436 bgcolor=#d6d6d6
| 594436 ||  || — || March 27, 2008 || Mount Lemmon || Mount Lemmon Survey ||  || align=right | 2.4 km || 
|-id=437 bgcolor=#d6d6d6
| 594437 ||  || — || September 30, 2005 || Mount Lemmon || Mount Lemmon Survey ||  || align=right | 2.0 km || 
|-id=438 bgcolor=#d6d6d6
| 594438 ||  || — || April 30, 2008 || Mount Lemmon || Mount Lemmon Survey ||  || align=right | 2.4 km || 
|-id=439 bgcolor=#d6d6d6
| 594439 ||  || — || May 8, 2014 || Haleakala || Pan-STARRS ||  || align=right | 2.2 km || 
|-id=440 bgcolor=#d6d6d6
| 594440 ||  || — || September 30, 2006 || Mount Lemmon || Mount Lemmon Survey ||  || align=right | 2.3 km || 
|-id=441 bgcolor=#d6d6d6
| 594441 ||  || — || October 18, 2011 || Haleakala || Pan-STARRS ||  || align=right | 2.4 km || 
|-id=442 bgcolor=#d6d6d6
| 594442 ||  || — || March 12, 2014 || Kitt Peak || Spacewatch ||  || align=right | 2.4 km || 
|-id=443 bgcolor=#E9E9E9
| 594443 ||  || — || June 28, 2015 || Haleakala || Pan-STARRS ||  || align=right | 3.2 km || 
|-id=444 bgcolor=#d6d6d6
| 594444 ||  || — || November 4, 2005 || Kitt Peak || Spacewatch ||  || align=right | 3.2 km || 
|-id=445 bgcolor=#d6d6d6
| 594445 ||  || — || October 21, 2016 || Mount Lemmon || Mount Lemmon Survey ||  || align=right | 2.0 km || 
|-id=446 bgcolor=#d6d6d6
| 594446 ||  || — || October 25, 2016 || Haleakala || Pan-STARRS ||  || align=right | 2.4 km || 
|-id=447 bgcolor=#fefefe
| 594447 ||  || — || March 16, 2007 || Mount Lemmon || Mount Lemmon Survey || H || align=right data-sort-value="0.62" | 620 m || 
|-id=448 bgcolor=#fefefe
| 594448 ||  || — || November 25, 2011 || Haleakala || Pan-STARRS || H || align=right data-sort-value="0.64" | 640 m || 
|-id=449 bgcolor=#d6d6d6
| 594449 ||  || — || June 3, 2014 || Haleakala || Pan-STARRS ||  || align=right | 3.2 km || 
|-id=450 bgcolor=#d6d6d6
| 594450 ||  || — || August 31, 2016 || Sayan Solar || Y. Karavaev ||  || align=right | 2.0 km || 
|-id=451 bgcolor=#d6d6d6
| 594451 ||  || — || March 8, 2008 || Mount Lemmon || Mount Lemmon Survey ||  || align=right | 2.5 km || 
|-id=452 bgcolor=#d6d6d6
| 594452 ||  || — || November 10, 2016 || Haleakala || Pan-STARRS ||  || align=right | 2.8 km || 
|-id=453 bgcolor=#d6d6d6
| 594453 ||  || — || November 3, 2016 || Haleakala || Pan-STARRS ||  || align=right | 2.5 km || 
|-id=454 bgcolor=#d6d6d6
| 594454 ||  || — || November 6, 2016 || Haleakala || Pan-STARRS ||  || align=right | 2.7 km || 
|-id=455 bgcolor=#d6d6d6
| 594455 ||  || — || November 10, 2016 || Haleakala || Pan-STARRS ||  || align=right | 2.2 km || 
|-id=456 bgcolor=#E9E9E9
| 594456 ||  || — || November 12, 1999 || Kitt Peak || Spacewatch ||  || align=right data-sort-value="0.87" | 870 m || 
|-id=457 bgcolor=#fefefe
| 594457 ||  || — || June 11, 2010 || Mount Lemmon || Mount Lemmon Survey || H || align=right data-sort-value="0.64" | 640 m || 
|-id=458 bgcolor=#FA8072
| 594458 ||  || — || February 15, 2015 || Haleakala || Pan-STARRS || H || align=right data-sort-value="0.67" | 670 m || 
|-id=459 bgcolor=#fefefe
| 594459 ||  || — || November 26, 2011 || Kitt Peak || Spacewatch || H || align=right data-sort-value="0.78" | 780 m || 
|-id=460 bgcolor=#fefefe
| 594460 ||  || — || November 19, 2016 || Haleakala || Pan-STARRS || H || align=right data-sort-value="0.59" | 590 m || 
|-id=461 bgcolor=#d6d6d6
| 594461 ||  || — || October 23, 2005 || Kitt Peak || Spacewatch ||  || align=right | 2.3 km || 
|-id=462 bgcolor=#d6d6d6
| 594462 ||  || — || December 5, 2005 || Kitt Peak || Spacewatch ||  || align=right | 2.4 km || 
|-id=463 bgcolor=#fefefe
| 594463 ||  || — || April 1, 2015 || Haleakala || Pan-STARRS || H || align=right data-sort-value="0.49" | 490 m || 
|-id=464 bgcolor=#fefefe
| 594464 ||  || — || September 26, 2000 || Haleakala || AMOS || H || align=right data-sort-value="0.63" | 630 m || 
|-id=465 bgcolor=#d6d6d6
| 594465 ||  || — || September 16, 2010 || Mount Lemmon || Mount Lemmon Survey ||  || align=right | 2.2 km || 
|-id=466 bgcolor=#d6d6d6
| 594466 ||  || — || March 13, 2013 || Mount Lemmon || Mount Lemmon Survey ||  || align=right | 2.8 km || 
|-id=467 bgcolor=#d6d6d6
| 594467 ||  || — || December 23, 2012 || Mount Lemmon || Mount Lemmon Survey ||  || align=right | 3.4 km || 
|-id=468 bgcolor=#d6d6d6
| 594468 ||  || — || March 25, 2008 || Kitt Peak || Spacewatch ||  || align=right | 2.4 km || 
|-id=469 bgcolor=#d6d6d6
| 594469 ||  || — || April 8, 2002 || Cerro Tololo || M. W. Buie, A. B. Jordan ||  || align=right | 2.6 km || 
|-id=470 bgcolor=#d6d6d6
| 594470 ||  || — || February 20, 2002 || Kitt Peak || Spacewatch ||  || align=right | 2.6 km || 
|-id=471 bgcolor=#d6d6d6
| 594471 ||  || — || January 20, 2012 || Catalina || CSS ||  || align=right | 2.9 km || 
|-id=472 bgcolor=#d6d6d6
| 594472 ||  || — || October 17, 2010 || Mount Lemmon || Mount Lemmon Survey ||  || align=right | 2.6 km || 
|-id=473 bgcolor=#d6d6d6
| 594473 ||  || — || May 21, 2014 || Haleakala || Pan-STARRS ||  || align=right | 2.3 km || 
|-id=474 bgcolor=#d6d6d6
| 594474 ||  || — || November 1, 2010 || Mount Lemmon || Mount Lemmon Survey ||  || align=right | 2.8 km || 
|-id=475 bgcolor=#d6d6d6
| 594475 ||  || — || December 29, 2011 || Mount Lemmon || Mount Lemmon Survey ||  || align=right | 2.4 km || 
|-id=476 bgcolor=#E9E9E9
| 594476 ||  || — || September 4, 2011 || Haleakala || Pan-STARRS ||  || align=right | 1.3 km || 
|-id=477 bgcolor=#d6d6d6
| 594477 ||  || — || November 19, 2016 || Mount Lemmon || Mount Lemmon Survey ||  || align=right | 2.7 km || 
|-id=478 bgcolor=#d6d6d6
| 594478 ||  || — || October 6, 2016 || Mount Lemmon || Mount Lemmon Survey ||  || align=right | 2.6 km || 
|-id=479 bgcolor=#d6d6d6
| 594479 ||  || — || September 21, 2001 || Apache Point || SDSS Collaboration ||  || align=right | 2.5 km || 
|-id=480 bgcolor=#d6d6d6
| 594480 ||  || — || September 2, 2016 || Mount Lemmon || Mount Lemmon Survey ||  || align=right | 2.6 km || 
|-id=481 bgcolor=#d6d6d6
| 594481 ||  || — || March 27, 2008 || Vail-Jarnac || Jarnac Obs. ||  || align=right | 3.3 km || 
|-id=482 bgcolor=#d6d6d6
| 594482 ||  || — || December 4, 2016 || Mount Lemmon || Mount Lemmon Survey ||  || align=right | 2.8 km || 
|-id=483 bgcolor=#d6d6d6
| 594483 ||  || — || August 27, 2005 || Kitt Peak || Spacewatch ||  || align=right | 3.4 km || 
|-id=484 bgcolor=#d6d6d6
| 594484 ||  || — || October 8, 2016 || Haleakala || Pan-STARRS ||  || align=right | 3.0 km || 
|-id=485 bgcolor=#d6d6d6
| 594485 ||  || — || August 27, 2005 || Palomar || NEAT ||  || align=right | 3.3 km || 
|-id=486 bgcolor=#d6d6d6
| 594486 ||  || — || July 2, 2014 || Haleakala || Pan-STARRS ||  || align=right | 3.6 km || 
|-id=487 bgcolor=#d6d6d6
| 594487 ||  || — || October 20, 2011 || Kitt Peak || Spacewatch ||  || align=right | 2.0 km || 
|-id=488 bgcolor=#d6d6d6
| 594488 ||  || — || October 13, 2004 || Anderson Mesa || LONEOS ||  || align=right | 3.6 km || 
|-id=489 bgcolor=#fefefe
| 594489 ||  || — || November 6, 2008 || Catalina || CSS || H || align=right data-sort-value="0.77" | 770 m || 
|-id=490 bgcolor=#d6d6d6
| 594490 ||  || — || January 7, 2006 || Mount Lemmon || Mount Lemmon Survey ||  || align=right | 3.1 km || 
|-id=491 bgcolor=#d6d6d6
| 594491 ||  || — || May 8, 2013 || Haleakala || Pan-STARRS ||  || align=right | 2.7 km || 
|-id=492 bgcolor=#d6d6d6
| 594492 ||  || — || April 12, 2002 || Palomar || NEAT ||  || align=right | 4.6 km || 
|-id=493 bgcolor=#fefefe
| 594493 ||  || — || February 14, 2012 || Haleakala || Pan-STARRS || H || align=right data-sort-value="0.38" | 380 m || 
|-id=494 bgcolor=#C2FFFF
| 594494 ||  || — || January 4, 2017 || Haleakala || Pan-STARRS || L5 || align=right | 7.9 km || 
|-id=495 bgcolor=#fefefe
| 594495 ||  || — || January 22, 2009 || Farra d'Isonzo || Farra d'Isonzo || H || align=right data-sort-value="0.67" | 670 m || 
|-id=496 bgcolor=#fefefe
| 594496 ||  || — || December 2, 2005 || Kitt Peak || Spacewatch || H || align=right data-sort-value="0.62" | 620 m || 
|-id=497 bgcolor=#d6d6d6
| 594497 ||  || — || October 1, 2005 || Mount Lemmon || Mount Lemmon Survey ||  || align=right | 3.0 km || 
|-id=498 bgcolor=#d6d6d6
| 594498 ||  || — || January 19, 2012 || Haleakala || Pan-STARRS ||  || align=right | 2.0 km || 
|-id=499 bgcolor=#fefefe
| 594499 ||  || — || December 28, 2016 || Haleakala || Pan-STARRS || H || align=right data-sort-value="0.74" | 740 m || 
|-id=500 bgcolor=#d6d6d6
| 594500 ||  || — || May 15, 2013 || Haleakala || Pan-STARRS ||  || align=right | 4.1 km || 
|}

594501–594600 

|-bgcolor=#d6d6d6
| 594501 ||  || — || October 3, 2015 || Mount Lemmon || Mount Lemmon Survey ||  || align=right | 2.7 km || 
|-id=502 bgcolor=#d6d6d6
| 594502 ||  || — || December 10, 2010 || Mount Lemmon || Mount Lemmon Survey || 7:4 || align=right | 2.7 km || 
|-id=503 bgcolor=#d6d6d6
| 594503 ||  || — || October 1, 2015 || Mount Lemmon || Mount Lemmon Survey ||  || align=right | 3.1 km || 
|-id=504 bgcolor=#d6d6d6
| 594504 ||  || — || January 17, 2005 || Kitt Peak || Spacewatch ||  || align=right | 2.7 km || 
|-id=505 bgcolor=#d6d6d6
| 594505 ||  || — || January 7, 2017 || Mount Lemmon || Mount Lemmon Survey ||  || align=right | 2.8 km || 
|-id=506 bgcolor=#d6d6d6
| 594506 ||  || — || September 16, 2009 || Mount Lemmon || Mount Lemmon Survey ||  || align=right | 2.1 km || 
|-id=507 bgcolor=#d6d6d6
| 594507 ||  || — || July 4, 2014 || Haleakala || Pan-STARRS ||  || align=right | 2.7 km || 
|-id=508 bgcolor=#d6d6d6
| 594508 ||  || — || May 15, 2012 || Haleakala || Pan-STARRS ||  || align=right | 3.0 km || 
|-id=509 bgcolor=#d6d6d6
| 594509 ||  || — || August 20, 2004 || Kitt Peak || Spacewatch ||  || align=right | 2.0 km || 
|-id=510 bgcolor=#fefefe
| 594510 ||  || — || September 15, 2004 || Kitt Peak || Spacewatch || H || align=right data-sort-value="0.80" | 800 m || 
|-id=511 bgcolor=#d6d6d6
| 594511 ||  || — || July 25, 2015 || Haleakala || Pan-STARRS ||  || align=right | 2.7 km || 
|-id=512 bgcolor=#d6d6d6
| 594512 ||  || — || November 1, 2015 || Mount Lemmon || Mount Lemmon Survey ||  || align=right | 2.8 km || 
|-id=513 bgcolor=#d6d6d6
| 594513 ||  || — || December 13, 2010 || Kitt Peak || Spacewatch || LIX || align=right | 2.8 km || 
|-id=514 bgcolor=#d6d6d6
| 594514 ||  || — || September 21, 2009 || Mount Lemmon || Mount Lemmon Survey ||  || align=right | 2.9 km || 
|-id=515 bgcolor=#d6d6d6
| 594515 ||  || — || September 25, 2009 || Mount Lemmon || Mount Lemmon Survey ||  || align=right | 2.9 km || 
|-id=516 bgcolor=#d6d6d6
| 594516 ||  || — || November 18, 2015 || Haleakala || Pan-STARRS ||  || align=right | 3.1 km || 
|-id=517 bgcolor=#d6d6d6
| 594517 ||  || — || January 22, 2006 || Mount Lemmon || Mount Lemmon Survey ||  || align=right | 2.2 km || 
|-id=518 bgcolor=#fefefe
| 594518 ||  || — || January 31, 2017 || Mount Lemmon || Mount Lemmon Survey || H || align=right data-sort-value="0.47" | 470 m || 
|-id=519 bgcolor=#fefefe
| 594519 ||  || — || September 3, 2007 || Catalina || CSS || H || align=right data-sort-value="0.50" | 500 m || 
|-id=520 bgcolor=#fefefe
| 594520 ||  || — || November 8, 2016 || Haleakala || Pan-STARRS || H || align=right data-sort-value="0.81" | 810 m || 
|-id=521 bgcolor=#fefefe
| 594521 ||  || — || February 2, 2017 || Haleakala || Pan-STARRS || H || align=right data-sort-value="0.63" | 630 m || 
|-id=522 bgcolor=#d6d6d6
| 594522 ||  || — || October 7, 2016 || Kitt Peak || Spacewatch || Tj (2.98) || align=right | 3.8 km || 
|-id=523 bgcolor=#d6d6d6
| 594523 ||  || — || September 20, 2009 || Mount Lemmon || Mount Lemmon Survey ||  || align=right | 2.0 km || 
|-id=524 bgcolor=#d6d6d6
| 594524 ||  || — || October 30, 2008 || Kitt Peak || Spacewatch || 7:4 || align=right | 3.9 km || 
|-id=525 bgcolor=#E9E9E9
| 594525 ||  || — || September 30, 2010 || Mount Lemmon || Mount Lemmon Survey ||  || align=right | 1.5 km || 
|-id=526 bgcolor=#d6d6d6
| 594526 ||  || — || September 19, 1998 || Apache Point || SDSS Collaboration ||  || align=right | 2.2 km || 
|-id=527 bgcolor=#d6d6d6
| 594527 ||  || — || April 25, 2012 || Mount Lemmon || Mount Lemmon Survey || Tj (2.99) || align=right | 3.6 km || 
|-id=528 bgcolor=#d6d6d6
| 594528 ||  || — || August 30, 1998 || Kitt Peak || Spacewatch ||  || align=right | 2.5 km || 
|-id=529 bgcolor=#d6d6d6
| 594529 ||  || — || March 2, 2006 || Kitt Peak || Spacewatch ||  || align=right | 2.3 km || 
|-id=530 bgcolor=#fefefe
| 594530 ||  || — || February 22, 2017 || Mount Lemmon || Mount Lemmon Survey || H || align=right data-sort-value="0.53" | 530 m || 
|-id=531 bgcolor=#fefefe
| 594531 ||  || — || October 11, 2004 || Kitt Peak || L. H. Wasserman, J. R. Lovering || H || align=right data-sort-value="0.63" | 630 m || 
|-id=532 bgcolor=#d6d6d6
| 594532 ||  || — || January 8, 2011 || Catalina || CSS || Tj (2.99) || align=right | 3.7 km || 
|-id=533 bgcolor=#fefefe
| 594533 ||  || — || February 10, 2007 || Mount Lemmon || Mount Lemmon Survey ||  || align=right data-sort-value="0.49" | 490 m || 
|-id=534 bgcolor=#d6d6d6
| 594534 ||  || — || March 14, 2007 || Mount Lemmon || Mount Lemmon Survey ||  || align=right | 3.6 km || 
|-id=535 bgcolor=#d6d6d6
| 594535 ||  || — || March 14, 2012 || Kitt Peak || Spacewatch ||  || align=right | 3.2 km || 
|-id=536 bgcolor=#d6d6d6
| 594536 ||  || — || February 25, 2017 || Haleakala || Pan-STARRS ||  || align=right | 2.1 km || 
|-id=537 bgcolor=#fefefe
| 594537 ||  || — || September 4, 2011 || Haleakala || Pan-STARRS ||  || align=right data-sort-value="0.58" | 580 m || 
|-id=538 bgcolor=#d6d6d6
| 594538 ||  || — || September 27, 2009 || Kitt Peak || Spacewatch || Tj (2.99) || align=right | 3.0 km || 
|-id=539 bgcolor=#fefefe
| 594539 ||  || — || June 25, 2015 || Haleakala || Pan-STARRS ||  || align=right data-sort-value="0.82" | 820 m || 
|-id=540 bgcolor=#fefefe
| 594540 ||  || — || October 23, 2003 || Kitt Peak || L. H. Wasserman, D. E. Trilling ||  || align=right data-sort-value="0.53" | 530 m || 
|-id=541 bgcolor=#fefefe
| 594541 ||  || — || March 4, 2012 || Mount Lemmon || Mount Lemmon Survey || H || align=right data-sort-value="0.62" | 620 m || 
|-id=542 bgcolor=#d6d6d6
| 594542 ||  || — || September 18, 2009 || Kitt Peak || Spacewatch ||  || align=right | 2.9 km || 
|-id=543 bgcolor=#d6d6d6
| 594543 ||  || — || October 9, 2004 || Anderson Mesa || LONEOS ||  || align=right | 4.5 km || 
|-id=544 bgcolor=#fefefe
| 594544 ||  || — || January 29, 2014 || Catalina || CSS || H || align=right data-sort-value="0.52" | 520 m || 
|-id=545 bgcolor=#FA8072
| 594545 ||  || — || February 15, 2010 || Kitt Peak || Spacewatch ||  || align=right data-sort-value="0.58" | 580 m || 
|-id=546 bgcolor=#fefefe
| 594546 ||  || — || July 26, 2011 || Haleakala || Pan-STARRS ||  || align=right data-sort-value="0.49" | 490 m || 
|-id=547 bgcolor=#fefefe
| 594547 ||  || — || October 19, 2007 || Mount Lemmon || Mount Lemmon Survey || H || align=right data-sort-value="0.51" | 510 m || 
|-id=548 bgcolor=#fefefe
| 594548 ||  || — || March 15, 2004 || Socorro || LINEAR ||  || align=right data-sort-value="0.73" | 730 m || 
|-id=549 bgcolor=#fefefe
| 594549 ||  || — || April 2, 2009 || Mount Lemmon || Mount Lemmon Survey || H || align=right data-sort-value="0.40" | 400 m || 
|-id=550 bgcolor=#fefefe
| 594550 ||  || — || April 5, 2014 || Haleakala || Pan-STARRS ||  || align=right data-sort-value="0.51" | 510 m || 
|-id=551 bgcolor=#fefefe
| 594551 ||  || — || August 3, 2015 || Haleakala || Pan-STARRS || H || align=right data-sort-value="0.66" | 660 m || 
|-id=552 bgcolor=#fefefe
| 594552 ||  || — || March 14, 2007 || Mount Lemmon || Mount Lemmon Survey ||  || align=right data-sort-value="0.59" | 590 m || 
|-id=553 bgcolor=#FA8072
| 594553 ||  || — || April 16, 2004 || Kitt Peak || Spacewatch ||  || align=right data-sort-value="0.68" | 680 m || 
|-id=554 bgcolor=#fefefe
| 594554 ||  || — || March 8, 2011 || Catalina || CSS ||  || align=right data-sort-value="0.76" | 760 m || 
|-id=555 bgcolor=#fefefe
| 594555 ||  || — || November 7, 2015 || Mount Lemmon || Mount Lemmon Survey ||  || align=right data-sort-value="0.57" | 570 m || 
|-id=556 bgcolor=#fefefe
| 594556 ||  || — || May 6, 2014 || Haleakala || Pan-STARRS ||  || align=right data-sort-value="0.48" | 480 m || 
|-id=557 bgcolor=#fefefe
| 594557 ||  || — || November 8, 2008 || Mount Lemmon || Mount Lemmon Survey ||  || align=right data-sort-value="0.76" | 760 m || 
|-id=558 bgcolor=#fefefe
| 594558 ||  || — || April 9, 2010 || Mount Lemmon || Mount Lemmon Survey ||  || align=right data-sort-value="0.63" | 630 m || 
|-id=559 bgcolor=#fefefe
| 594559 ||  || — || August 22, 2003 || Palomar || NEAT ||  || align=right data-sort-value="0.67" | 670 m || 
|-id=560 bgcolor=#fefefe
| 594560 ||  || — || January 28, 2007 || Kitt Peak || Spacewatch ||  || align=right data-sort-value="0.51" | 510 m || 
|-id=561 bgcolor=#fefefe
| 594561 ||  || — || December 26, 2011 || Mount Lemmon || Mount Lemmon Survey ||  || align=right data-sort-value="0.66" | 660 m || 
|-id=562 bgcolor=#fefefe
| 594562 ||  || — || August 11, 2004 || Palomar || NEAT ||  || align=right data-sort-value="0.80" | 800 m || 
|-id=563 bgcolor=#C2FFFF
| 594563 ||  || — || September 28, 2009 || Mount Lemmon || Mount Lemmon Survey || L4 || align=right | 11 km || 
|-id=564 bgcolor=#fefefe
| 594564 ||  || — || December 31, 2007 || Mount Lemmon || Mount Lemmon Survey ||  || align=right data-sort-value="0.76" | 760 m || 
|-id=565 bgcolor=#fefefe
| 594565 ||  || — || June 8, 2013 || Mount Lemmon || Mount Lemmon Survey ||  || align=right data-sort-value="0.56" | 560 m || 
|-id=566 bgcolor=#fefefe
| 594566 ||  || — || January 3, 2016 || Haleakala || Pan-STARRS ||  || align=right data-sort-value="0.57" | 570 m || 
|-id=567 bgcolor=#fefefe
| 594567 ||  || — || July 17, 2002 || Palomar || NEAT ||  || align=right data-sort-value="0.76" | 760 m || 
|-id=568 bgcolor=#fefefe
| 594568 ||  || — || September 18, 2003 || Palomar || NEAT ||  || align=right data-sort-value="0.76" | 760 m || 
|-id=569 bgcolor=#fefefe
| 594569 ||  || — || September 12, 2007 || Catalina || CSS ||  || align=right data-sort-value="0.89" | 890 m || 
|-id=570 bgcolor=#fefefe
| 594570 ||  || — || January 8, 2016 || Haleakala || Pan-STARRS ||  || align=right data-sort-value="0.77" | 770 m || 
|-id=571 bgcolor=#fefefe
| 594571 ||  || — || August 19, 2006 || Kitt Peak || Spacewatch ||  || align=right data-sort-value="0.63" | 630 m || 
|-id=572 bgcolor=#fefefe
| 594572 ||  || — || October 22, 2003 || Kitt Peak || Kitt Peak Obs. ||  || align=right data-sort-value="0.66" | 660 m || 
|-id=573 bgcolor=#fefefe
| 594573 ||  || — || June 19, 2010 || Mount Lemmon || Mount Lemmon Survey ||  || align=right data-sort-value="0.76" | 760 m || 
|-id=574 bgcolor=#fefefe
| 594574 ||  || — || October 29, 2010 || Piszkesteto || Z. Kuli, K. Sárneczky ||  || align=right data-sort-value="0.62" | 620 m || 
|-id=575 bgcolor=#fefefe
| 594575 ||  || — || February 5, 2016 || Haleakala || Pan-STARRS ||  || align=right data-sort-value="0.67" | 670 m || 
|-id=576 bgcolor=#fefefe
| 594576 ||  || — || August 8, 2013 || Haleakala || Pan-STARRS ||  || align=right data-sort-value="0.80" | 800 m || 
|-id=577 bgcolor=#E9E9E9
| 594577 ||  || — || March 18, 2004 || Kitt Peak || Spacewatch ||  || align=right data-sort-value="0.73" | 730 m || 
|-id=578 bgcolor=#fefefe
| 594578 ||  || — || April 7, 2013 || Kitt Peak || Spacewatch ||  || align=right data-sort-value="0.63" | 630 m || 
|-id=579 bgcolor=#E9E9E9
| 594579 ||  || — || October 5, 2013 || Haleakala || Pan-STARRS ||  || align=right data-sort-value="0.97" | 970 m || 
|-id=580 bgcolor=#fefefe
| 594580 ||  || — || October 11, 2010 || Catalina || CSS ||  || align=right data-sort-value="0.71" | 710 m || 
|-id=581 bgcolor=#E9E9E9
| 594581 ||  || — || February 21, 2007 || Mount Lemmon || Mount Lemmon Survey ||  || align=right data-sort-value="0.84" | 840 m || 
|-id=582 bgcolor=#fefefe
| 594582 ||  || — || April 15, 2005 || Kitt Peak || Spacewatch ||  || align=right data-sort-value="0.69" | 690 m || 
|-id=583 bgcolor=#fefefe
| 594583 ||  || — || August 28, 2006 || Catalina || CSS ||  || align=right data-sort-value="0.58" | 580 m || 
|-id=584 bgcolor=#fefefe
| 594584 ||  || — || February 19, 2012 || Kitt Peak || Spacewatch ||  || align=right data-sort-value="0.62" | 620 m || 
|-id=585 bgcolor=#fefefe
| 594585 ||  || — || February 10, 2008 || Kitt Peak || Spacewatch ||  || align=right data-sort-value="0.78" | 780 m || 
|-id=586 bgcolor=#E9E9E9
| 594586 ||  || — || August 15, 2013 || Haleakala || Pan-STARRS ||  || align=right data-sort-value="0.93" | 930 m || 
|-id=587 bgcolor=#E9E9E9
| 594587 ||  || — || October 1, 2005 || Mount Lemmon || Mount Lemmon Survey ||  || align=right data-sort-value="0.84" | 840 m || 
|-id=588 bgcolor=#fefefe
| 594588 ||  || — || July 21, 2017 || ESA OGS || ESA OGS ||  || align=right data-sort-value="0.65" | 650 m || 
|-id=589 bgcolor=#fefefe
| 594589 ||  || — || July 22, 2017 || Haleakala || Pan-STARRS ||  || align=right data-sort-value="0.71" | 710 m || 
|-id=590 bgcolor=#E9E9E9
| 594590 ||  || — || July 25, 2017 || Haleakala || Pan-STARRS ||  || align=right data-sort-value="0.85" | 850 m || 
|-id=591 bgcolor=#d6d6d6
| 594591 ||  || — || May 8, 2010 || Mount Lemmon || Mount Lemmon Survey ||  || align=right | 2.5 km || 
|-id=592 bgcolor=#E9E9E9
| 594592 ||  || — || July 29, 2017 || Haleakala || Pan-STARRS ||  || align=right | 1.3 km || 
|-id=593 bgcolor=#fefefe
| 594593 ||  || — || September 16, 2002 || Palomar || NEAT ||  || align=right data-sort-value="0.75" | 750 m || 
|-id=594 bgcolor=#fefefe
| 594594 ||  || — || November 23, 2014 || Mount Lemmon || Mount Lemmon Survey ||  || align=right data-sort-value="0.58" | 580 m || 
|-id=595 bgcolor=#fefefe
| 594595 ||  || — || September 17, 1995 || Kitt Peak || Spacewatch ||  || align=right data-sort-value="0.67" | 670 m || 
|-id=596 bgcolor=#E9E9E9
| 594596 ||  || — || February 7, 2011 || Mount Lemmon || Mount Lemmon Survey ||  || align=right | 1.1 km || 
|-id=597 bgcolor=#fefefe
| 594597 ||  || — || February 3, 2012 || Haleakala || Pan-STARRS ||  || align=right data-sort-value="0.94" | 940 m || 
|-id=598 bgcolor=#fefefe
| 594598 ||  || — || November 1, 2010 || Mount Lemmon || Mount Lemmon Survey ||  || align=right data-sort-value="0.55" | 550 m || 
|-id=599 bgcolor=#fefefe
| 594599 ||  || — || January 14, 2016 || Haleakala || Pan-STARRS ||  || align=right data-sort-value="0.55" | 550 m || 
|-id=600 bgcolor=#fefefe
| 594600 ||  || — || February 16, 2012 || Haleakala || Pan-STARRS ||  || align=right data-sort-value="0.67" | 670 m || 
|}

594601–594700 

|-bgcolor=#E9E9E9
| 594601 ||  || — || January 20, 2015 || Haleakala || Pan-STARRS ||  || align=right | 1.1 km || 
|-id=602 bgcolor=#fefefe
| 594602 ||  || — || February 11, 2016 || Haleakala || Pan-STARRS ||  || align=right data-sort-value="0.57" | 570 m || 
|-id=603 bgcolor=#fefefe
| 594603 ||  || — || November 20, 2006 || Mount Lemmon || Mount Lemmon Survey ||  || align=right data-sort-value="0.84" | 840 m || 
|-id=604 bgcolor=#fefefe
| 594604 ||  || — || February 26, 2004 || Kitt Peak || M. W. Buie, D. E. Trilling ||  || align=right data-sort-value="0.71" | 710 m || 
|-id=605 bgcolor=#fefefe
| 594605 ||  || — || January 14, 2016 || Haleakala || Pan-STARRS ||  || align=right data-sort-value="0.57" | 570 m || 
|-id=606 bgcolor=#fefefe
| 594606 ||  || — || September 26, 2006 || Kitt Peak || Spacewatch ||  || align=right data-sort-value="0.54" | 540 m || 
|-id=607 bgcolor=#E9E9E9
| 594607 ||  || — || August 15, 2017 || Haleakala || Pan-STARRS ||  || align=right | 1.2 km || 
|-id=608 bgcolor=#fefefe
| 594608 ||  || — || September 15, 2010 || Mount Lemmon || Mount Lemmon Survey ||  || align=right data-sort-value="0.89" | 890 m || 
|-id=609 bgcolor=#fefefe
| 594609 ||  || — || December 20, 2004 || Mount Lemmon || Mount Lemmon Survey ||  || align=right data-sort-value="0.68" | 680 m || 
|-id=610 bgcolor=#fefefe
| 594610 ||  || — || December 12, 2004 || Kitt Peak || Spacewatch ||  || align=right data-sort-value="0.82" | 820 m || 
|-id=611 bgcolor=#fefefe
| 594611 ||  || — || February 11, 2016 || Haleakala || Pan-STARRS ||  || align=right data-sort-value="0.64" | 640 m || 
|-id=612 bgcolor=#fefefe
| 594612 ||  || — || February 1, 2009 || Kitt Peak || Spacewatch ||  || align=right data-sort-value="0.76" | 760 m || 
|-id=613 bgcolor=#fefefe
| 594613 ||  || — || December 19, 2004 || Mount Lemmon || Mount Lemmon Survey ||  || align=right data-sort-value="0.54" | 540 m || 
|-id=614 bgcolor=#fefefe
| 594614 ||  || — || October 19, 2006 || Mount Lemmon || Mount Lemmon Survey ||  || align=right data-sort-value="0.67" | 670 m || 
|-id=615 bgcolor=#fefefe
| 594615 ||  || — || February 3, 2012 || Haleakala || Pan-STARRS ||  || align=right data-sort-value="0.63" | 630 m || 
|-id=616 bgcolor=#fefefe
| 594616 ||  || — || March 11, 2016 || Mount Lemmon || Mount Lemmon Survey ||  || align=right data-sort-value="0.87" | 870 m || 
|-id=617 bgcolor=#fefefe
| 594617 ||  || — || January 18, 2008 || Kitt Peak || Spacewatch ||  || align=right data-sort-value="0.80" | 800 m || 
|-id=618 bgcolor=#fefefe
| 594618 ||  || — || July 26, 2017 || Haleakala || Pan-STARRS ||  || align=right data-sort-value="0.81" | 810 m || 
|-id=619 bgcolor=#E9E9E9
| 594619 ||  || — || August 28, 2013 || Catalina || CSS ||  || align=right | 1.2 km || 
|-id=620 bgcolor=#fefefe
| 594620 ||  || — || January 11, 2008 || Kitt Peak || Spacewatch ||  || align=right data-sort-value="0.56" | 560 m || 
|-id=621 bgcolor=#fefefe
| 594621 ||  || — || December 18, 2007 || Mount Lemmon || Mount Lemmon Survey ||  || align=right data-sort-value="0.62" | 620 m || 
|-id=622 bgcolor=#fefefe
| 594622 ||  || — || August 24, 2006 || Palomar || NEAT ||  || align=right data-sort-value="0.80" | 800 m || 
|-id=623 bgcolor=#fefefe
| 594623 ||  || — || September 28, 2006 || Mount Lemmon || Mount Lemmon Survey ||  || align=right data-sort-value="0.76" | 760 m || 
|-id=624 bgcolor=#fefefe
| 594624 ||  || — || January 31, 2016 || Haleakala || Pan-STARRS ||  || align=right data-sort-value="0.71" | 710 m || 
|-id=625 bgcolor=#fefefe
| 594625 ||  || — || January 12, 2011 || Kitt Peak || Spacewatch ||  || align=right data-sort-value="0.72" | 720 m || 
|-id=626 bgcolor=#E9E9E9
| 594626 ||  || — || April 14, 2008 || Mount Lemmon || Mount Lemmon Survey ||  || align=right | 1.7 km || 
|-id=627 bgcolor=#fefefe
| 594627 ||  || — || November 20, 2014 || Mount Lemmon || Mount Lemmon Survey ||  || align=right | 1.1 km || 
|-id=628 bgcolor=#fefefe
| 594628 ||  || — || December 13, 2006 || Mount Lemmon || Mount Lemmon Survey ||  || align=right data-sort-value="0.85" | 850 m || 
|-id=629 bgcolor=#E9E9E9
| 594629 ||  || — || February 11, 2011 || Mount Lemmon || Mount Lemmon Survey ||  || align=right data-sort-value="0.64" | 640 m || 
|-id=630 bgcolor=#fefefe
| 594630 ||  || — || January 19, 2008 || Mount Lemmon || Mount Lemmon Survey ||  || align=right data-sort-value="0.92" | 920 m || 
|-id=631 bgcolor=#fefefe
| 594631 ||  || — || May 31, 2009 || Mount Lemmon || Mount Lemmon Survey ||  || align=right data-sort-value="0.83" | 830 m || 
|-id=632 bgcolor=#E9E9E9
| 594632 ||  || — || February 20, 2015 || Haleakala || Pan-STARRS ||  || align=right data-sort-value="0.73" | 730 m || 
|-id=633 bgcolor=#fefefe
| 594633 ||  || — || August 8, 2013 || Haleakala || Pan-STARRS ||  || align=right data-sort-value="0.95" | 950 m || 
|-id=634 bgcolor=#fefefe
| 594634 ||  || — || January 10, 2003 || Kitt Peak || Spacewatch ||  || align=right data-sort-value="0.70" | 700 m || 
|-id=635 bgcolor=#fefefe
| 594635 ||  || — || May 18, 2001 || Haleakala || AMOS ||  || align=right data-sort-value="0.98" | 980 m || 
|-id=636 bgcolor=#fefefe
| 594636 ||  || — || September 17, 2006 || Kitt Peak || Spacewatch ||  || align=right data-sort-value="0.65" | 650 m || 
|-id=637 bgcolor=#E9E9E9
| 594637 ||  || — || March 15, 2007 || Kitt Peak || Spacewatch ||  || align=right data-sort-value="0.71" | 710 m || 
|-id=638 bgcolor=#E9E9E9
| 594638 ||  || — || October 25, 2005 || Mount Lemmon || Mount Lemmon Survey ||  || align=right | 1.2 km || 
|-id=639 bgcolor=#fefefe
| 594639 ||  || — || September 15, 2006 || Kitt Peak || Spacewatch ||  || align=right data-sort-value="0.99" | 990 m || 
|-id=640 bgcolor=#E9E9E9
| 594640 ||  || — || March 13, 2016 || Haleakala || Pan-STARRS ||  || align=right data-sort-value="0.67" | 670 m || 
|-id=641 bgcolor=#fefefe
| 594641 ||  || — || April 3, 2008 || Mount Lemmon || Mount Lemmon Survey ||  || align=right data-sort-value="0.58" | 580 m || 
|-id=642 bgcolor=#fefefe
| 594642 ||  || — || October 2, 2006 || Mount Lemmon || Mount Lemmon Survey ||  || align=right data-sort-value="0.75" | 750 m || 
|-id=643 bgcolor=#E9E9E9
| 594643 ||  || — || January 25, 2006 || Kitt Peak || Spacewatch ||  || align=right | 1.4 km || 
|-id=644 bgcolor=#E9E9E9
| 594644 ||  || — || October 2, 2013 || Haleakala || Pan-STARRS ||  || align=right data-sort-value="0.58" | 580 m || 
|-id=645 bgcolor=#E9E9E9
| 594645 ||  || — || March 13, 2007 || Kitt Peak || Spacewatch ||  || align=right data-sort-value="0.76" | 760 m || 
|-id=646 bgcolor=#E9E9E9
| 594646 ||  || — || January 2, 2011 || Mount Lemmon || Mount Lemmon Survey ||  || align=right data-sort-value="0.69" | 690 m || 
|-id=647 bgcolor=#E9E9E9
| 594647 ||  || — || February 23, 2007 || Mount Lemmon || Mount Lemmon Survey ||  || align=right data-sort-value="0.59" | 590 m || 
|-id=648 bgcolor=#E9E9E9
| 594648 ||  || — || March 6, 2011 || Kitt Peak || Spacewatch ||  || align=right | 1.2 km || 
|-id=649 bgcolor=#E9E9E9
| 594649 ||  || — || October 5, 2013 || Mount Lemmon || Mount Lemmon Survey ||  || align=right data-sort-value="0.76" | 760 m || 
|-id=650 bgcolor=#E9E9E9
| 594650 ||  || — || January 4, 2010 || Kitt Peak || Spacewatch ||  || align=right | 1.1 km || 
|-id=651 bgcolor=#E9E9E9
| 594651 ||  || — || January 20, 2015 || Haleakala || Pan-STARRS ||  || align=right | 1.4 km || 
|-id=652 bgcolor=#E9E9E9
| 594652 ||  || — || October 2, 2013 || Kitt Peak || Spacewatch ||  || align=right | 1.4 km || 
|-id=653 bgcolor=#E9E9E9
| 594653 ||  || — || April 4, 2003 || Kitt Peak || Spacewatch ||  || align=right | 1.1 km || 
|-id=654 bgcolor=#fefefe
| 594654 ||  || — || October 19, 2006 || Kitt Peak || L. H. Wasserman ||  || align=right data-sort-value="0.88" | 880 m || 
|-id=655 bgcolor=#fefefe
| 594655 ||  || — || July 18, 2006 || Mount Lemmon || Mount Lemmon Survey ||  || align=right data-sort-value="0.67" | 670 m || 
|-id=656 bgcolor=#fefefe
| 594656 ||  || — || November 15, 2006 || Kitt Peak || Spacewatch ||  || align=right data-sort-value="0.73" | 730 m || 
|-id=657 bgcolor=#E9E9E9
| 594657 ||  || — || February 12, 2002 || Kitt Peak || Spacewatch ||  || align=right | 1.4 km || 
|-id=658 bgcolor=#fefefe
| 594658 ||  || — || February 2, 2008 || Kitt Peak || Spacewatch ||  || align=right data-sort-value="0.75" | 750 m || 
|-id=659 bgcolor=#fefefe
| 594659 ||  || — || January 30, 2011 || Mount Lemmon || Mount Lemmon Survey ||  || align=right data-sort-value="0.68" | 680 m || 
|-id=660 bgcolor=#E9E9E9
| 594660 ||  || — || April 19, 2012 || Mount Lemmon || Mount Lemmon Survey ||  || align=right data-sort-value="0.56" | 560 m || 
|-id=661 bgcolor=#E9E9E9
| 594661 ||  || — || October 26, 2013 || Kitt Peak || Spacewatch ||  || align=right | 1.2 km || 
|-id=662 bgcolor=#E9E9E9
| 594662 ||  || — || December 1, 2006 || Mount Lemmon || Mount Lemmon Survey ||  || align=right | 1.3 km || 
|-id=663 bgcolor=#E9E9E9
| 594663 ||  || — || October 26, 2008 || Mount Lemmon || Mount Lemmon Survey ||  || align=right | 1.5 km || 
|-id=664 bgcolor=#E9E9E9
| 594664 ||  || — || May 29, 2003 || Cerro Tololo || M. W. Buie, K. J. Meech ||  || align=right | 1.5 km || 
|-id=665 bgcolor=#E9E9E9
| 594665 ||  || — || October 25, 2005 || Mount Lemmon || Mount Lemmon Survey ||  || align=right data-sort-value="0.65" | 650 m || 
|-id=666 bgcolor=#E9E9E9
| 594666 ||  || — || May 13, 2007 || Mount Lemmon || Mount Lemmon Survey ||  || align=right | 1.4 km || 
|-id=667 bgcolor=#E9E9E9
| 594667 ||  || — || September 21, 2012 || Mount Lemmon || Mount Lemmon Survey ||  || align=right | 1.6 km || 
|-id=668 bgcolor=#fefefe
| 594668 ||  || — || July 1, 2013 || Haleakala || Pan-STARRS ||  || align=right data-sort-value="0.70" | 700 m || 
|-id=669 bgcolor=#E9E9E9
| 594669 ||  || — || December 18, 2001 || Socorro || LINEAR ||  || align=right data-sort-value="0.76" | 760 m || 
|-id=670 bgcolor=#fefefe
| 594670 ||  || — || February 28, 2009 || Mount Lemmon || Mount Lemmon Survey ||  || align=right data-sort-value="0.95" | 950 m || 
|-id=671 bgcolor=#fefefe
| 594671 ||  || — || August 12, 2013 || Haleakala || Pan-STARRS ||  || align=right data-sort-value="0.69" | 690 m || 
|-id=672 bgcolor=#E9E9E9
| 594672 ||  || — || February 23, 2007 || Mount Lemmon || Mount Lemmon Survey ||  || align=right | 1.7 km || 
|-id=673 bgcolor=#E9E9E9
| 594673 ||  || — || February 21, 2007 || Mount Lemmon || Mount Lemmon Survey ||  || align=right | 1.2 km || 
|-id=674 bgcolor=#fefefe
| 594674 ||  || — || September 27, 2010 || Kitt Peak || Spacewatch ||  || align=right data-sort-value="0.73" | 730 m || 
|-id=675 bgcolor=#fefefe
| 594675 ||  || — || March 25, 2000 || Kitt Peak || Spacewatch ||  || align=right data-sort-value="0.65" | 650 m || 
|-id=676 bgcolor=#fefefe
| 594676 ||  || — || March 31, 2009 || Catalina || CSS ||  || align=right data-sort-value="0.85" | 850 m || 
|-id=677 bgcolor=#E9E9E9
| 594677 ||  || — || April 20, 2007 || Mount Lemmon || Mount Lemmon Survey ||  || align=right | 1.2 km || 
|-id=678 bgcolor=#E9E9E9
| 594678 ||  || — || October 4, 2005 || Mount Lemmon || Mount Lemmon Survey ||  || align=right data-sort-value="0.67" | 670 m || 
|-id=679 bgcolor=#E9E9E9
| 594679 ||  || — || October 1, 2013 || Kitt Peak || Spacewatch ||  || align=right | 1.0 km || 
|-id=680 bgcolor=#E9E9E9
| 594680 ||  || — || January 6, 2010 || Kitt Peak || Spacewatch ||  || align=right | 1.1 km || 
|-id=681 bgcolor=#fefefe
| 594681 ||  || — || February 10, 2007 || Mount Lemmon || Mount Lemmon Survey ||  || align=right data-sort-value="0.78" | 780 m || 
|-id=682 bgcolor=#fefefe
| 594682 ||  || — || October 20, 2003 || Kitt Peak || Spacewatch ||  || align=right data-sort-value="0.76" | 760 m || 
|-id=683 bgcolor=#E9E9E9
| 594683 ||  || — || December 29, 2014 || Haleakala || Pan-STARRS ||  || align=right data-sort-value="0.93" | 930 m || 
|-id=684 bgcolor=#E9E9E9
| 594684 ||  || — || January 13, 2015 || Haleakala || Pan-STARRS ||  || align=right | 1.3 km || 
|-id=685 bgcolor=#fefefe
| 594685 ||  || — || September 9, 2013 || Haleakala || Pan-STARRS ||  || align=right data-sort-value="0.85" | 850 m || 
|-id=686 bgcolor=#E9E9E9
| 594686 ||  || — || September 17, 2004 || Socorro || LINEAR ||  || align=right | 1.7 km || 
|-id=687 bgcolor=#fefefe
| 594687 ||  || — || April 6, 2008 || Mount Lemmon || Mount Lemmon Survey ||  || align=right data-sort-value="0.97" | 970 m || 
|-id=688 bgcolor=#fefefe
| 594688 ||  || — || August 15, 2013 || Haleakala || Pan-STARRS ||  || align=right data-sort-value="0.69" | 690 m || 
|-id=689 bgcolor=#E9E9E9
| 594689 ||  || — || May 8, 2008 || Mount Lemmon || Mount Lemmon Survey ||  || align=right data-sort-value="0.96" | 960 m || 
|-id=690 bgcolor=#E9E9E9
| 594690 ||  || — || September 23, 2004 || Kitt Peak || Spacewatch ||  || align=right | 1.4 km || 
|-id=691 bgcolor=#fefefe
| 594691 ||  || — || September 26, 2017 || Haleakala || Pan-STARRS ||  || align=right data-sort-value="0.66" | 660 m || 
|-id=692 bgcolor=#fefefe
| 594692 ||  || — || January 22, 2015 || Haleakala || Pan-STARRS ||  || align=right data-sort-value="0.75" | 750 m || 
|-id=693 bgcolor=#E9E9E9
| 594693 ||  || — || September 16, 2009 || Kitt Peak || Spacewatch ||  || align=right data-sort-value="0.68" | 680 m || 
|-id=694 bgcolor=#E9E9E9
| 594694 ||  || — || September 13, 2013 || Mount Lemmon || Mount Lemmon Survey ||  || align=right data-sort-value="0.91" | 910 m || 
|-id=695 bgcolor=#E9E9E9
| 594695 ||  || — || September 23, 2017 || Haleakala || Pan-STARRS ||  || align=right | 1.4 km || 
|-id=696 bgcolor=#E9E9E9
| 594696 ||  || — || August 16, 2004 || Siding Spring || SSS ||  || align=right data-sort-value="0.81" | 810 m || 
|-id=697 bgcolor=#E9E9E9
| 594697 ||  || — || September 27, 2017 || Haleakala || Pan-STARRS ||  || align=right | 1.4 km || 
|-id=698 bgcolor=#E9E9E9
| 594698 ||  || — || September 23, 2017 || Haleakala || Pan-STARRS ||  || align=right | 1.6 km || 
|-id=699 bgcolor=#E9E9E9
| 594699 ||  || — || September 30, 2017 || Mount Lemmon || Mount Lemmon Survey ||  || align=right data-sort-value="0.84" | 840 m || 
|-id=700 bgcolor=#E9E9E9
| 594700 ||  || — || September 23, 2017 || Haleakala || Pan-STARRS ||  || align=right | 1.2 km || 
|}

594701–594800 

|-bgcolor=#E9E9E9
| 594701 ||  || — || September 25, 2017 || Haleakala || Pan-STARRS ||  || align=right data-sort-value="0.90" | 900 m || 
|-id=702 bgcolor=#E9E9E9
| 594702 ||  || — || September 30, 2017 || Haleakala || Pan-STARRS ||  || align=right | 1.3 km || 
|-id=703 bgcolor=#E9E9E9
| 594703 ||  || — || September 19, 2017 || Haleakala || Pan-STARRS ||  || align=right | 1.5 km || 
|-id=704 bgcolor=#E9E9E9
| 594704 ||  || — || September 14, 2013 || Mount Lemmon || Mount Lemmon Survey ||  || align=right | 1.0 km || 
|-id=705 bgcolor=#E9E9E9
| 594705 ||  || — || April 24, 2012 || Mount Lemmon || Mount Lemmon Survey ||  || align=right | 1.4 km || 
|-id=706 bgcolor=#E9E9E9
| 594706 ||  || — || October 15, 2017 || Mount Lemmon || Mount Lemmon Survey ||  || align=right | 1.2 km || 
|-id=707 bgcolor=#E9E9E9
| 594707 ||  || — || November 11, 2013 || Kitt Peak || Spacewatch ||  || align=right data-sort-value="0.47" | 470 m || 
|-id=708 bgcolor=#E9E9E9
| 594708 ||  || — || March 16, 2007 || Mount Lemmon || Mount Lemmon Survey ||  || align=right | 1.3 km || 
|-id=709 bgcolor=#fefefe
| 594709 ||  || — || August 15, 2013 || Haleakala || Pan-STARRS ||  || align=right data-sort-value="0.68" | 680 m || 
|-id=710 bgcolor=#E9E9E9
| 594710 ||  || — || June 8, 2016 || Haleakala || Pan-STARRS ||  || align=right | 1.2 km || 
|-id=711 bgcolor=#E9E9E9
| 594711 ||  || — || November 10, 2013 || Mount Lemmon || Mount Lemmon Survey ||  || align=right data-sort-value="0.94" | 940 m || 
|-id=712 bgcolor=#E9E9E9
| 594712 ||  || — || April 14, 2007 || Kitt Peak || Spacewatch ||  || align=right | 1.0 km || 
|-id=713 bgcolor=#E9E9E9
| 594713 ||  || — || April 3, 2003 || Cerro Tololo || Cerro Tololo Obs. ||  || align=right data-sort-value="0.87" | 870 m || 
|-id=714 bgcolor=#E9E9E9
| 594714 ||  || — || November 26, 2013 || Mount Lemmon || Mount Lemmon Survey ||  || align=right | 1.1 km || 
|-id=715 bgcolor=#E9E9E9
| 594715 ||  || — || September 18, 2012 || Mount Lemmon || Mount Lemmon Survey ||  || align=right | 1.6 km || 
|-id=716 bgcolor=#E9E9E9
| 594716 ||  || — || March 14, 2010 || Mount Lemmon || Mount Lemmon Survey ||  || align=right | 1.8 km || 
|-id=717 bgcolor=#E9E9E9
| 594717 ||  || — || October 21, 2003 || Kitt Peak || Spacewatch ||  || align=right | 2.6 km || 
|-id=718 bgcolor=#E9E9E9
| 594718 ||  || — || October 21, 2017 || Mount Lemmon || Mount Lemmon Survey ||  || align=right | 1.2 km || 
|-id=719 bgcolor=#E9E9E9
| 594719 ||  || — || October 23, 2017 || Mount Lemmon || Mount Lemmon Survey ||  || align=right | 1.2 km || 
|-id=720 bgcolor=#E9E9E9
| 594720 ||  || — || October 27, 2017 || Mount Lemmon || Mount Lemmon Survey ||  || align=right | 1.2 km || 
|-id=721 bgcolor=#E9E9E9
| 594721 ||  || — || October 27, 2017 || Mount Lemmon || Mount Lemmon Survey ||  || align=right | 1.5 km || 
|-id=722 bgcolor=#d6d6d6
| 594722 ||  || — || October 28, 2017 || Haleakala || Pan-STARRS ||  || align=right | 1.6 km || 
|-id=723 bgcolor=#E9E9E9
| 594723 ||  || — || October 6, 2012 || Haleakala || Pan-STARRS ||  || align=right | 2.0 km || 
|-id=724 bgcolor=#E9E9E9
| 594724 ||  || — || October 24, 2017 || Mount Lemmon || Mount Lemmon Survey ||  || align=right data-sort-value="0.81" | 810 m || 
|-id=725 bgcolor=#E9E9E9
| 594725 ||  || — || August 30, 2008 || Socorro || LINEAR ||  || align=right | 1.7 km || 
|-id=726 bgcolor=#E9E9E9
| 594726 ||  || — || March 26, 2007 || Mount Lemmon || Mount Lemmon Survey ||  || align=right | 1.1 km || 
|-id=727 bgcolor=#E9E9E9
| 594727 ||  || — || March 24, 2015 || Mount Lemmon || Mount Lemmon Survey ||  || align=right | 1.5 km || 
|-id=728 bgcolor=#E9E9E9
| 594728 ||  || — || April 19, 2012 || Mount Lemmon || Mount Lemmon Survey ||  || align=right data-sort-value="0.87" | 870 m || 
|-id=729 bgcolor=#E9E9E9
| 594729 ||  || — || May 12, 2015 || Mount Lemmon || Mount Lemmon Survey ||  || align=right | 1.8 km || 
|-id=730 bgcolor=#E9E9E9
| 594730 ||  || — || December 2, 2008 || Kitt Peak || Spacewatch ||  || align=right | 1.5 km || 
|-id=731 bgcolor=#d6d6d6
| 594731 ||  || — || December 24, 2013 || Mount Lemmon || Mount Lemmon Survey ||  || align=right | 2.4 km || 
|-id=732 bgcolor=#E9E9E9
| 594732 ||  || — || September 23, 2008 || Kitt Peak || Spacewatch ||  || align=right | 1.3 km || 
|-id=733 bgcolor=#E9E9E9
| 594733 ||  || — || September 7, 2004 || Socorro || LINEAR ||  || align=right | 1.2 km || 
|-id=734 bgcolor=#E9E9E9
| 594734 ||  || — || November 27, 2013 || Haleakala || Pan-STARRS ||  || align=right data-sort-value="0.71" | 710 m || 
|-id=735 bgcolor=#E9E9E9
| 594735 ||  || — || November 7, 2017 || Haleakala || Pan-STARRS ||  || align=right data-sort-value="0.73" | 730 m || 
|-id=736 bgcolor=#E9E9E9
| 594736 ||  || — || September 18, 2003 || Kitt Peak || Spacewatch ||  || align=right | 1.5 km || 
|-id=737 bgcolor=#E9E9E9
| 594737 ||  || — || July 16, 2004 || Siding Spring || SSS ||  || align=right | 1.2 km || 
|-id=738 bgcolor=#d6d6d6
| 594738 ||  || — || August 29, 2006 || Kitt Peak || Spacewatch ||  || align=right | 1.9 km || 
|-id=739 bgcolor=#d6d6d6
| 594739 ||  || — || February 26, 2014 || Haleakala || Pan-STARRS ||  || align=right | 2.6 km || 
|-id=740 bgcolor=#E9E9E9
| 594740 ||  || — || February 16, 2015 || Haleakala || Pan-STARRS ||  || align=right | 1.0 km || 
|-id=741 bgcolor=#E9E9E9
| 594741 ||  || — || March 4, 2005 || Kitt Peak || Spacewatch ||  || align=right | 1.7 km || 
|-id=742 bgcolor=#E9E9E9
| 594742 ||  || — || November 10, 2008 || La Sagra || OAM Obs. ||  || align=right | 2.5 km || 
|-id=743 bgcolor=#E9E9E9
| 594743 ||  || — || October 26, 2013 || Mount Lemmon || Mount Lemmon Survey ||  || align=right data-sort-value="0.80" | 800 m || 
|-id=744 bgcolor=#d6d6d6
| 594744 ||  || — || November 18, 2017 || Haleakala || Pan-STARRS ||  || align=right | 2.0 km || 
|-id=745 bgcolor=#E9E9E9
| 594745 ||  || — || November 18, 2017 || Haleakala || Pan-STARRS ||  || align=right | 1.4 km || 
|-id=746 bgcolor=#d6d6d6
| 594746 ||  || — || November 21, 2017 || Haleakala || Pan-STARRS ||  || align=right | 2.0 km || 
|-id=747 bgcolor=#E9E9E9
| 594747 ||  || — || June 8, 2016 || Haleakala || Pan-STARRS ||  || align=right | 1.5 km || 
|-id=748 bgcolor=#E9E9E9
| 594748 ||  || — || June 2, 2016 || Mount Lemmon || Mount Lemmon Survey ||  || align=right | 1.1 km || 
|-id=749 bgcolor=#E9E9E9
| 594749 ||  || — || October 29, 2008 || Kitt Peak || Spacewatch ||  || align=right | 1.5 km || 
|-id=750 bgcolor=#E9E9E9
| 594750 ||  || — || October 16, 2009 || Mount Lemmon || Mount Lemmon Survey ||  || align=right data-sort-value="0.95" | 950 m || 
|-id=751 bgcolor=#E9E9E9
| 594751 ||  || — || November 21, 2003 || Kitt Peak || Spacewatch ||  || align=right | 1.4 km || 
|-id=752 bgcolor=#d6d6d6
| 594752 ||  || — || April 25, 2015 || Haleakala || Pan-STARRS ||  || align=right | 2.2 km || 
|-id=753 bgcolor=#E9E9E9
| 594753 ||  || — || September 22, 2008 || Kitt Peak || Spacewatch ||  || align=right | 1.3 km || 
|-id=754 bgcolor=#E9E9E9
| 594754 ||  || — || November 7, 2008 || Mount Lemmon || Mount Lemmon Survey ||  || align=right | 1.5 km || 
|-id=755 bgcolor=#E9E9E9
| 594755 ||  || — || September 23, 2012 || Mount Lemmon || Mount Lemmon Survey ||  || align=right | 1.5 km || 
|-id=756 bgcolor=#E9E9E9
| 594756 ||  || — || November 3, 2004 || Kitt Peak || Spacewatch ||  || align=right | 1.1 km || 
|-id=757 bgcolor=#E9E9E9
| 594757 ||  || — || September 21, 2008 || Kitt Peak || Spacewatch ||  || align=right | 1.3 km || 
|-id=758 bgcolor=#fefefe
| 594758 ||  || — || January 30, 2011 || Mount Lemmon || Mount Lemmon Survey ||  || align=right data-sort-value="0.84" | 840 m || 
|-id=759 bgcolor=#E9E9E9
| 594759 ||  || — || September 29, 2008 || Kitt Peak || Spacewatch ||  || align=right | 1.2 km || 
|-id=760 bgcolor=#d6d6d6
| 594760 ||  || — || November 7, 2012 || Mount Lemmon || Mount Lemmon Survey ||  || align=right | 2.0 km || 
|-id=761 bgcolor=#d6d6d6
| 594761 ||  || — || February 3, 2009 || Kitt Peak || Spacewatch ||  || align=right | 1.8 km || 
|-id=762 bgcolor=#E9E9E9
| 594762 ||  || — || October 19, 2003 || Kitt Peak || Spacewatch ||  || align=right | 1.8 km || 
|-id=763 bgcolor=#d6d6d6
| 594763 ||  || — || October 9, 2007 || Mount Lemmon || Mount Lemmon Survey ||  || align=right | 1.6 km || 
|-id=764 bgcolor=#E9E9E9
| 594764 ||  || — || November 2, 2008 || Kitt Peak || Spacewatch ||  || align=right | 1.6 km || 
|-id=765 bgcolor=#E9E9E9
| 594765 ||  || — || December 1, 2008 || Kitt Peak || Spacewatch ||  || align=right | 1.7 km || 
|-id=766 bgcolor=#E9E9E9
| 594766 ||  || — || September 21, 2012 || Mount Lemmon || Mount Lemmon Survey ||  || align=right | 1.6 km || 
|-id=767 bgcolor=#E9E9E9
| 594767 ||  || — || March 10, 1997 || Kitt Peak || Spacewatch ||  || align=right | 1.5 km || 
|-id=768 bgcolor=#d6d6d6
| 594768 ||  || — || April 23, 2015 || Haleakala || Pan-STARRS ||  || align=right | 2.3 km || 
|-id=769 bgcolor=#FFC2E0
| 594769 ||  || — || December 15, 2017 || Mount Lemmon || Mount Lemmon Survey || AMO || align=right data-sort-value="0.42" | 420 m || 
|-id=770 bgcolor=#E9E9E9
| 594770 ||  || — || June 8, 2012 || Mount Lemmon || Mount Lemmon Survey ||  || align=right data-sort-value="0.82" | 820 m || 
|-id=771 bgcolor=#d6d6d6
| 594771 ||  || — || November 16, 2006 || Kitt Peak || Spacewatch ||  || align=right | 2.5 km || 
|-id=772 bgcolor=#d6d6d6
| 594772 ||  || — || August 22, 2004 || Kitt Peak || Spacewatch ||  || align=right | 2.5 km || 
|-id=773 bgcolor=#E9E9E9
| 594773 ||  || — || September 22, 2017 || Haleakala || Pan-STARRS ||  || align=right data-sort-value="0.86" | 860 m || 
|-id=774 bgcolor=#d6d6d6
| 594774 ||  || — || January 25, 2003 || Kitt Peak || Spacewatch ||  || align=right | 2.3 km || 
|-id=775 bgcolor=#E9E9E9
| 594775 ||  || — || March 25, 2007 || Mount Lemmon || Mount Lemmon Survey ||  || align=right | 1.7 km || 
|-id=776 bgcolor=#d6d6d6
| 594776 ||  || — || February 3, 2008 || Mount Lemmon || Mount Lemmon Survey ||  || align=right | 2.0 km || 
|-id=777 bgcolor=#d6d6d6
| 594777 ||  || — || October 7, 2005 || Mount Lemmon || Mount Lemmon Survey ||  || align=right | 2.5 km || 
|-id=778 bgcolor=#E9E9E9
| 594778 ||  || — || December 13, 2004 || Kitt Peak || Spacewatch ||  || align=right | 1.4 km || 
|-id=779 bgcolor=#E9E9E9
| 594779 ||  || — || December 19, 2009 || Mount Lemmon || Mount Lemmon Survey ||  || align=right | 2.6 km || 
|-id=780 bgcolor=#E9E9E9
| 594780 ||  || — || December 24, 2013 || Catalina || CSS ||  || align=right | 1.5 km || 
|-id=781 bgcolor=#E9E9E9
| 594781 ||  || — || January 1, 2014 || Nogales || M. Schwartz, P. R. Holvorcem ||  || align=right | 1.5 km || 
|-id=782 bgcolor=#E9E9E9
| 594782 Kacperwierzchos ||  ||  || December 2, 2013 || Tincana || M. Żołnowski, M. Kusiak ||  || align=right | 1.0 km || 
|-id=783 bgcolor=#d6d6d6
| 594783 ||  || — || December 25, 2017 || Haleakala || Pan-STARRS ||  || align=right | 2.7 km || 
|-id=784 bgcolor=#d6d6d6
| 594784 ||  || — || December 23, 2017 || Haleakala || Pan-STARRS ||  || align=right | 3.1 km || 
|-id=785 bgcolor=#d6d6d6
| 594785 ||  || — || December 29, 2017 || Haleakala || Pan-STARRS ||  || align=right | 2.5 km || 
|-id=786 bgcolor=#E9E9E9
| 594786 ||  || — || August 26, 2012 || Haleakala || Pan-STARRS ||  || align=right | 1.5 km || 
|-id=787 bgcolor=#d6d6d6
| 594787 ||  || — || November 23, 2011 || Mount Lemmon || Mount Lemmon Survey ||  || align=right | 2.6 km || 
|-id=788 bgcolor=#E9E9E9
| 594788 ||  || — || September 23, 2008 || Kitt Peak || Spacewatch ||  || align=right | 1.2 km || 
|-id=789 bgcolor=#d6d6d6
| 594789 ||  || — || March 5, 2013 || Mount Lemmon || Mount Lemmon Survey ||  || align=right | 2.8 km || 
|-id=790 bgcolor=#d6d6d6
| 594790 ||  || — || January 15, 2018 || Haleakala || Pan-STARRS ||  || align=right | 1.6 km || 
|-id=791 bgcolor=#FA8072
| 594791 ||  || — || January 23, 2006 || Kitt Peak || Spacewatch ||  || align=right data-sort-value="0.97" | 970 m || 
|-id=792 bgcolor=#E9E9E9
| 594792 ||  || — || December 1, 2008 || Catalina || CSS ||  || align=right | 1.1 km || 
|-id=793 bgcolor=#d6d6d6
| 594793 ||  || — || February 23, 2007 || Kitt Peak || Spacewatch ||  || align=right | 2.4 km || 
|-id=794 bgcolor=#d6d6d6
| 594794 ||  || — || November 17, 2006 || Kitt Peak || Spacewatch ||  || align=right | 2.3 km || 
|-id=795 bgcolor=#d6d6d6
| 594795 ||  || — || March 10, 2007 || Mount Lemmon || Mount Lemmon Survey ||  || align=right | 2.2 km || 
|-id=796 bgcolor=#d6d6d6
| 594796 ||  || — || December 1, 2010 || Mount Lemmon || Mount Lemmon Survey ||  || align=right | 3.0 km || 
|-id=797 bgcolor=#E9E9E9
| 594797 ||  || — || February 1, 2009 || Mount Lemmon || Mount Lemmon Survey ||  || align=right | 2.4 km || 
|-id=798 bgcolor=#E9E9E9
| 594798 ||  || — || December 31, 2008 || Mount Lemmon || Mount Lemmon Survey ||  || align=right | 2.1 km || 
|-id=799 bgcolor=#d6d6d6
| 594799 ||  || — || April 14, 2008 || Mount Lemmon || Mount Lemmon Survey ||  || align=right | 3.3 km || 
|-id=800 bgcolor=#E9E9E9
| 594800 ||  || — || March 26, 1996 || Haleakala || AMOS ||  || align=right | 1.7 km || 
|}

594801–594900 

|-bgcolor=#d6d6d6
| 594801 ||  || — || April 17, 2013 || Siding Spring || SSS ||  || align=right | 4.3 km || 
|-id=802 bgcolor=#E9E9E9
| 594802 ||  || — || December 14, 2004 || Socorro || LINEAR ||  || align=right | 1.5 km || 
|-id=803 bgcolor=#d6d6d6
| 594803 ||  || — || January 18, 2007 || Palomar || NEAT || Tj (2.98) || align=right | 2.3 km || 
|-id=804 bgcolor=#d6d6d6
| 594804 ||  || — || December 18, 2001 || Socorro || LINEAR ||  || align=right | 2.7 km || 
|-id=805 bgcolor=#E9E9E9
| 594805 ||  || — || January 13, 2005 || Kitt Peak || Spacewatch ||  || align=right | 1.5 km || 
|-id=806 bgcolor=#E9E9E9
| 594806 ||  || — || January 21, 2004 || Socorro || LINEAR ||  || align=right | 2.0 km || 
|-id=807 bgcolor=#d6d6d6
| 594807 ||  || — || January 4, 2013 || Kitt Peak || Spacewatch ||  || align=right | 2.0 km || 
|-id=808 bgcolor=#d6d6d6
| 594808 ||  || — || October 23, 2011 || Haleakala || Pan-STARRS ||  || align=right | 2.3 km || 
|-id=809 bgcolor=#d6d6d6
| 594809 ||  || — || February 10, 2018 || Mount Lemmon || Mount Lemmon Survey ||  || align=right | 2.5 km || 
|-id=810 bgcolor=#d6d6d6
| 594810 ||  || — || August 29, 2005 || Kitt Peak || Spacewatch ||  || align=right | 2.7 km || 
|-id=811 bgcolor=#d6d6d6
| 594811 ||  || — || August 15, 2009 || Kitt Peak || Spacewatch ||  || align=right | 3.7 km || 
|-id=812 bgcolor=#d6d6d6
| 594812 ||  || — || March 7, 2018 || Haleakala || Pan-STARRS ||  || align=right | 2.5 km || 
|-id=813 bgcolor=#d6d6d6
| 594813 ||  || — || January 26, 2012 || Mount Lemmon || Mount Lemmon Survey ||  || align=right | 2.4 km || 
|-id=814 bgcolor=#d6d6d6
| 594814 ||  || — || February 21, 2007 || Kitt Peak || Spacewatch ||  || align=right | 3.1 km || 
|-id=815 bgcolor=#d6d6d6
| 594815 ||  || — || November 4, 2004 || Kitt Peak || Spacewatch ||  || align=right | 3.1 km || 
|-id=816 bgcolor=#d6d6d6
| 594816 ||  || — || September 18, 2009 || Kitt Peak || Spacewatch ||  || align=right | 2.7 km || 
|-id=817 bgcolor=#d6d6d6
| 594817 ||  || — || November 26, 2005 || Kitt Peak || Spacewatch ||  || align=right | 3.1 km || 
|-id=818 bgcolor=#d6d6d6
| 594818 ||  || — || March 9, 2007 || Mount Lemmon || Mount Lemmon Survey ||  || align=right | 2.8 km || 
|-id=819 bgcolor=#fefefe
| 594819 ||  || — || October 12, 2007 || Catalina || CSS ||  || align=right data-sort-value="0.67" | 670 m || 
|-id=820 bgcolor=#FA8072
| 594820 ||  || — || September 16, 2009 || Catalina || CSS ||  || align=right data-sort-value="0.54" | 540 m || 
|-id=821 bgcolor=#fefefe
| 594821 ||  || — || May 8, 2013 || Haleakala || Pan-STARRS || H || align=right data-sort-value="0.46" | 460 m || 
|-id=822 bgcolor=#fefefe
| 594822 ||  || — || April 24, 2018 || Mount Lemmon || Mount Lemmon Survey || H || align=right data-sort-value="0.49" | 490 m || 
|-id=823 bgcolor=#fefefe
| 594823 ||  || — || February 19, 2015 || Haleakala || Pan-STARRS || H || align=right data-sort-value="0.48" | 480 m || 
|-id=824 bgcolor=#fefefe
| 594824 ||  || — || September 20, 2003 || Palomar || NEAT || H || align=right data-sort-value="0.52" | 520 m || 
|-id=825 bgcolor=#C2FFFF
| 594825 ||  || — || June 17, 2018 || Haleakala || Pan-STARRS || L4 || align=right | 5.5 km || 
|-id=826 bgcolor=#fefefe
| 594826 ||  || — || March 21, 2012 || Haleakala || Pan-STARRS || H || align=right data-sort-value="0.60" | 600 m || 
|-id=827 bgcolor=#C2FFFF
| 594827 ||  || — || July 10, 2018 || Haleakala || Pan-STARRS || L4 || align=right | 6.3 km || 
|-id=828 bgcolor=#fefefe
| 594828 ||  || — || June 17, 2010 || Mount Lemmon || Mount Lemmon Survey || H || align=right data-sort-value="0.51" | 510 m || 
|-id=829 bgcolor=#fefefe
| 594829 ||  || — || November 8, 2015 || Haleakala || Pan-STARRS ||  || align=right data-sort-value="0.53" | 530 m || 
|-id=830 bgcolor=#fefefe
| 594830 ||  || — || September 10, 2007 || Mount Lemmon || Mount Lemmon Survey || H || align=right data-sort-value="0.61" | 610 m || 
|-id=831 bgcolor=#fefefe
| 594831 ||  || — || December 29, 2008 || Mount Lemmon || Mount Lemmon Survey ||  || align=right data-sort-value="0.50" | 500 m || 
|-id=832 bgcolor=#fefefe
| 594832 ||  || — || August 22, 2014 || Haleakala || Pan-STARRS ||  || align=right | 1.0 km || 
|-id=833 bgcolor=#fefefe
| 594833 ||  || — || December 29, 2008 || Kitt Peak || Spacewatch ||  || align=right data-sort-value="0.53" | 530 m || 
|-id=834 bgcolor=#fefefe
| 594834 ||  || — || May 23, 2001 || Cerro Tololo || J. L. Elliot, L. H. Wasserman ||  || align=right data-sort-value="0.64" | 640 m || 
|-id=835 bgcolor=#fefefe
| 594835 ||  || — || November 24, 2003 || Kitt Peak || Spacewatch ||  || align=right data-sort-value="0.80" | 800 m || 
|-id=836 bgcolor=#FA8072
| 594836 ||  || — || April 7, 2008 || Kitt Peak || Spacewatch ||  || align=right data-sort-value="0.55" | 550 m || 
|-id=837 bgcolor=#fefefe
| 594837 ||  || — || December 7, 1999 || Kitt Peak || Spacewatch ||  || align=right data-sort-value="0.53" | 530 m || 
|-id=838 bgcolor=#fefefe
| 594838 ||  || — || October 12, 2007 || Kitt Peak || Spacewatch ||  || align=right data-sort-value="0.57" | 570 m || 
|-id=839 bgcolor=#fefefe
| 594839 ||  || — || October 24, 2011 || Haleakala || Pan-STARRS ||  || align=right data-sort-value="0.55" | 550 m || 
|-id=840 bgcolor=#fefefe
| 594840 ||  || — || April 9, 2002 || Cerro Tololo || M. W. Buie, A. B. Jordan ||  || align=right data-sort-value="0.52" | 520 m || 
|-id=841 bgcolor=#fefefe
| 594841 ||  || — || March 18, 2010 || Mount Lemmon || Mount Lemmon Survey ||  || align=right data-sort-value="0.60" | 600 m || 
|-id=842 bgcolor=#fefefe
| 594842 ||  || — || January 3, 2016 || Haleakala || Pan-STARRS ||  || align=right data-sort-value="0.53" | 530 m || 
|-id=843 bgcolor=#fefefe
| 594843 ||  || — || April 22, 2014 || Catalina || CSS ||  || align=right data-sort-value="0.73" | 730 m || 
|-id=844 bgcolor=#fefefe
| 594844 ||  || — || December 31, 2007 || Kitt Peak || Spacewatch ||  || align=right data-sort-value="0.66" | 660 m || 
|-id=845 bgcolor=#fefefe
| 594845 ||  || — || November 18, 2007 || Mount Lemmon || Mount Lemmon Survey ||  || align=right data-sort-value="0.65" | 650 m || 
|-id=846 bgcolor=#fefefe
| 594846 ||  || — || April 25, 2017 || Haleakala || Pan-STARRS ||  || align=right data-sort-value="0.51" | 510 m || 
|-id=847 bgcolor=#fefefe
| 594847 ||  || — || February 10, 2008 || Kitt Peak || Spacewatch ||  || align=right data-sort-value="0.67" | 670 m || 
|-id=848 bgcolor=#E9E9E9
| 594848 ||  || — || February 25, 2011 || Kitt Peak || Spacewatch ||  || align=right | 1.0 km || 
|-id=849 bgcolor=#fefefe
| 594849 ||  || — || December 12, 2004 || Kitt Peak || Spacewatch ||  || align=right data-sort-value="0.87" | 870 m || 
|-id=850 bgcolor=#d6d6d6
| 594850 ||  || — || November 4, 2007 || Mount Lemmon || Mount Lemmon Survey ||  || align=right | 2.7 km || 
|-id=851 bgcolor=#fefefe
| 594851 ||  || — || May 24, 2006 || Kitt Peak || Spacewatch ||  || align=right data-sort-value="0.89" | 890 m || 
|-id=852 bgcolor=#fefefe
| 594852 ||  || — || April 30, 1997 || Socorro || LINEAR ||  || align=right | 1.3 km || 
|-id=853 bgcolor=#fefefe
| 594853 ||  || — || October 10, 2010 || Mount Lemmon || Mount Lemmon Survey ||  || align=right data-sort-value="0.89" | 890 m || 
|-id=854 bgcolor=#E9E9E9
| 594854 ||  || — || November 2, 2013 || Mount Lemmon || Mount Lemmon Survey ||  || align=right | 1.1 km || 
|-id=855 bgcolor=#E9E9E9
| 594855 ||  || — || January 19, 2015 || Haleakala || Pan-STARRS ||  || align=right | 2.0 km || 
|-id=856 bgcolor=#E9E9E9
| 594856 ||  || — || December 24, 2005 || Kitt Peak || Spacewatch ||  || align=right | 1.3 km || 
|-id=857 bgcolor=#E9E9E9
| 594857 ||  || — || January 10, 2006 || Mount Lemmon || Mount Lemmon Survey ||  || align=right | 1.4 km || 
|-id=858 bgcolor=#E9E9E9
| 594858 ||  || — || January 17, 2015 || Haleakala || Pan-STARRS ||  || align=right | 1.0 km || 
|-id=859 bgcolor=#E9E9E9
| 594859 ||  || — || December 22, 2000 || Kitt Peak || Spacewatch ||  || align=right | 1.5 km || 
|-id=860 bgcolor=#E9E9E9
| 594860 ||  || — || October 30, 2008 || Mount Lemmon || Mount Lemmon Survey ||  || align=right | 1.8 km || 
|-id=861 bgcolor=#E9E9E9
| 594861 ||  || — || September 23, 2004 || Kitt Peak || Spacewatch ||  || align=right | 1.5 km || 
|-id=862 bgcolor=#fefefe
| 594862 ||  || — || November 26, 2014 || Mount Lemmon || Mount Lemmon Survey ||  || align=right data-sort-value="0.84" | 840 m || 
|-id=863 bgcolor=#fefefe
| 594863 ||  || — || February 1, 2009 || Mount Lemmon || Mount Lemmon Survey ||  || align=right data-sort-value="0.80" | 800 m || 
|-id=864 bgcolor=#fefefe
| 594864 ||  || — || September 3, 2010 || Mount Lemmon || Mount Lemmon Survey ||  || align=right data-sort-value="0.62" | 620 m || 
|-id=865 bgcolor=#E9E9E9
| 594865 ||  || — || January 15, 2015 || Haleakala || Pan-STARRS ||  || align=right data-sort-value="0.96" | 960 m || 
|-id=866 bgcolor=#fefefe
| 594866 ||  || — || February 28, 2008 || Catalina || CSS ||  || align=right data-sort-value="0.93" | 930 m || 
|-id=867 bgcolor=#d6d6d6
| 594867 ||  || — || April 30, 2009 || Kitt Peak || Spacewatch ||  || align=right | 2.1 km || 
|-id=868 bgcolor=#E9E9E9
| 594868 ||  || — || January 2, 2019 || Haleakala || Pan-STARRS ||  || align=right | 1.7 km || 
|-id=869 bgcolor=#E9E9E9
| 594869 ||  || — || September 23, 2017 || Haleakala || Pan-STARRS ||  || align=right | 1.1 km || 
|-id=870 bgcolor=#fefefe
| 594870 ||  || — || February 12, 2002 || Palomar || NEAT ||  || align=right data-sort-value="0.94" | 940 m || 
|-id=871 bgcolor=#E9E9E9
| 594871 ||  || — || April 22, 2007 || Mount Lemmon || Mount Lemmon Survey ||  || align=right | 1.4 km || 
|-id=872 bgcolor=#C7FF8F
| 594872 ||  || — || February 4, 2019 || Haleakala || Pan-STARRS || centaurdamocloid || align=right | 9.7 km || 
|-id=873 bgcolor=#E9E9E9
| 594873 ||  || — || February 6, 2002 || Palomar || NEAT ||  || align=right | 1.1 km || 
|-id=874 bgcolor=#E9E9E9
| 594874 ||  || — || November 19, 2009 || Kitt Peak || Spacewatch ||  || align=right data-sort-value="0.97" | 970 m || 
|-id=875 bgcolor=#E9E9E9
| 594875 ||  || — || October 7, 2008 || Mount Lemmon || Mount Lemmon Survey ||  || align=right | 1.2 km || 
|-id=876 bgcolor=#fefefe
| 594876 ||  || — || December 29, 2014 || Haleakala || Pan-STARRS ||  || align=right | 1.2 km || 
|-id=877 bgcolor=#fefefe
| 594877 ||  || — || September 13, 2007 || Mount Lemmon || Mount Lemmon Survey ||  || align=right data-sort-value="0.67" | 670 m || 
|-id=878 bgcolor=#E9E9E9
| 594878 ||  || — || February 21, 2007 || Mount Lemmon || Mount Lemmon Survey ||  || align=right data-sort-value="0.50" | 500 m || 
|-id=879 bgcolor=#d6d6d6
| 594879 ||  || — || February 10, 2008 || Mount Lemmon || Mount Lemmon Survey ||  || align=right | 2.0 km || 
|-id=880 bgcolor=#E9E9E9
| 594880 ||  || — || February 15, 2010 || Catalina || CSS ||  || align=right | 1.7 km || 
|-id=881 bgcolor=#d6d6d6
| 594881 ||  || — || November 2, 2007 || Mount Lemmon || Mount Lemmon Survey ||  || align=right | 2.2 km || 
|-id=882 bgcolor=#d6d6d6
| 594882 ||  || — || April 9, 2008 || Kitt Peak || Spacewatch ||  || align=right | 2.4 km || 
|-id=883 bgcolor=#d6d6d6
| 594883 ||  || — || March 31, 2019 || Mount Lemmon || Mount Lemmon Survey ||  || align=right | 2.6 km || 
|-id=884 bgcolor=#d6d6d6
| 594884 ||  || — || November 19, 2007 || Kitt Peak || Spacewatch ||  || align=right | 3.3 km || 
|-id=885 bgcolor=#E9E9E9
| 594885 ||  || — || October 23, 2003 || Kitt Peak || Spacewatch ||  || align=right | 1.7 km || 
|-id=886 bgcolor=#d6d6d6
| 594886 ||  || — || November 16, 2006 || Mount Lemmon || Mount Lemmon Survey ||  || align=right | 2.1 km || 
|-id=887 bgcolor=#d6d6d6
| 594887 ||  || — || May 2, 2008 || Mount Lemmon || Mount Lemmon Survey ||  || align=right | 2.9 km || 
|-id=888 bgcolor=#E9E9E9
| 594888 ||  || — || February 2, 2006 || Kitt Peak || Spacewatch ||  || align=right | 2.0 km || 
|-id=889 bgcolor=#d6d6d6
| 594889 ||  || — || February 28, 2008 || Mount Lemmon || Mount Lemmon Survey ||  || align=right | 2.1 km || 
|-id=890 bgcolor=#d6d6d6
| 594890 ||  || — || October 7, 2016 || Haleakala || Pan-STARRS ||  || align=right | 2.6 km || 
|-id=891 bgcolor=#E9E9E9
| 594891 ||  || — || October 9, 2007 || Mount Lemmon || Mount Lemmon Survey ||  || align=right | 2.0 km || 
|-id=892 bgcolor=#d6d6d6
| 594892 ||  || — || September 15, 2004 || Kitt Peak || Spacewatch ||  || align=right | 3.2 km || 
|-id=893 bgcolor=#d6d6d6
| 594893 ||  || — || December 24, 2006 || Kitt Peak || Spacewatch ||  || align=right | 3.4 km || 
|-id=894 bgcolor=#E9E9E9
| 594894 ||  || — || January 8, 2010 || Kitt Peak || Spacewatch ||  || align=right | 1.9 km || 
|-id=895 bgcolor=#d6d6d6
| 594895 ||  || — || March 30, 2008 || Kitt Peak || Spacewatch ||  || align=right | 3.1 km || 
|-id=896 bgcolor=#d6d6d6
| 594896 ||  || — || November 21, 2005 || Kitt Peak || Spacewatch ||  || align=right | 2.7 km || 
|-id=897 bgcolor=#d6d6d6
| 594897 ||  || — || November 12, 2010 || Mount Lemmon || Mount Lemmon Survey ||  || align=right | 2.4 km || 
|-id=898 bgcolor=#E9E9E9
| 594898 ||  || — || February 27, 2006 || Kitt Peak || Spacewatch ||  || align=right | 1.3 km || 
|-id=899 bgcolor=#fefefe
| 594899 ||  || — || March 9, 2011 || Mount Lemmon || Mount Lemmon Survey ||  || align=right data-sort-value="0.96" | 960 m || 
|-id=900 bgcolor=#d6d6d6
| 594900 ||  || — || October 3, 2015 || Haleakala || Pan-STARRS ||  || align=right | 2.6 km || 
|}

594901–595000 

|-bgcolor=#E9E9E9
| 594901 ||  || — || October 9, 2016 || Mount Lemmon || Mount Lemmon Survey ||  || align=right | 1.9 km || 
|-id=902 bgcolor=#C2FFFF
| 594902 ||  || — || October 9, 2010 || Mount Lemmon || Mount Lemmon Survey || L4 || align=right | 9.3 km || 
|-id=903 bgcolor=#C2FFFF
| 594903 ||  || — || October 30, 2010 || Mount Lemmon || Mount Lemmon Survey || L4 || align=right | 9.5 km || 
|-id=904 bgcolor=#d6d6d6
| 594904 ||  || — || November 6, 2010 || Kitt Peak || Spacewatch ||  || align=right | 2.8 km || 
|-id=905 bgcolor=#C2FFFF
| 594905 ||  || — || June 1, 2019 || Haleakala || Pan-STARRS || L4 || align=right | 10 km || 
|-id=906 bgcolor=#C2FFFF
| 594906 ||  || — || April 9, 2014 || Haleakala || Pan-STARRS || L4 || align=right | 8.1 km || 
|-id=907 bgcolor=#C2FFFF
| 594907 ||  || — || June 29, 2019 || Haleakala || Pan-STARRS || L4 || align=right | 7.2 km || 
|-id=908 bgcolor=#C2FFFF
| 594908 ||  || — || December 2, 2010 || Mount Lemmon || Mount Lemmon Survey || L4 || align=right | 7.8 km || 
|-id=909 bgcolor=#C2FFFF
| 594909 ||  || — || July 28, 2019 || Haleakala || Pan-STARRS 2 || L4 || align=right | 7.3 km || 
|-id=910 bgcolor=#C2FFFF
| 594910 ||  || — || March 21, 2015 || Haleakala || Pan-STARRS || L4 || align=right | 6.7 km || 
|-id=911 bgcolor=#C2FFFF
| 594911 ||  || — || August 4, 2019 || Haleakala || Pan-STARRS || L4 || align=right | 6.0 km || 
|-id=912 bgcolor=#C2FFFF
| 594912 ||  || — || November 17, 2011 || Mount Lemmon || Mount Lemmon Survey || L4 || align=right | 11 km || 
|-id=913 bgcolor=#FFC2E0
| 594913 'Ayló'chaxnim ||  ||  || January 4, 2020 || Palomar || ZTF || ATI +1km || align=right | 2.1 km || 
|-id=914 bgcolor=#fefefe
| 594914 ||  || — || May 27, 2017 || Haleakala || Pan-STARRS ||  || align=right data-sort-value="0.59" | 590 m || 
|-id=915 bgcolor=#fefefe
| 594915 ||  || — || March 25, 2007 || Mount Lemmon || Mount Lemmon Survey ||  || align=right data-sort-value="0.56" | 560 m || 
|-id=916 bgcolor=#E9E9E9
| 594916 ||  || — || July 31, 2000 || Cerro Tololo || M. W. Buie, S. D. Kern ||  || align=right data-sort-value="0.85" | 850 m || 
|-id=917 bgcolor=#E9E9E9
| 594917 ||  || — || October 15, 2017 || Mount Lemmon || Mount Lemmon Survey ||  || align=right | 1.2 km || 
|-id=918 bgcolor=#d6d6d6
| 594918 ||  || — || September 24, 2011 || Haleakala || Pan-STARRS ||  || align=right | 2.4 km || 
|-id=919 bgcolor=#E9E9E9
| 594919 ||  || — || October 8, 2004 || Palomar || NEAT ||  || align=right data-sort-value="0.98" | 980 m || 
|-id=920 bgcolor=#d6d6d6
| 594920 ||  || — || October 26, 2011 || Haleakala || Pan-STARRS ||  || align=right | 2.4 km || 
|-id=921 bgcolor=#E9E9E9
| 594921 ||  || — || June 12, 2016 || Mount Lemmon || Mount Lemmon Survey ||  || align=right | 1.4 km || 
|-id=922 bgcolor=#E9E9E9
| 594922 ||  || — || January 22, 2015 || Haleakala || Pan-STARRS ||  || align=right | 1.8 km || 
|-id=923 bgcolor=#d6d6d6
| 594923 ||  || — || October 2, 2016 || Haleakala || Pan-STARRS ||  || align=right | 2.6 km || 
|-id=924 bgcolor=#E9E9E9
| 594924 ||  || — || August 7, 2016 || Haleakala || Pan-STARRS ||  || align=right | 1.6 km || 
|-id=925 bgcolor=#E9E9E9
| 594925 ||  || — || April 16, 2007 || Mount Lemmon || Mount Lemmon Survey ||  || align=right | 1.1 km || 
|-id=926 bgcolor=#E9E9E9
| 594926 ||  || — || January 24, 2006 || Kitt Peak || Spacewatch ||  || align=right | 1.3 km || 
|-id=927 bgcolor=#fefefe
| 594927 ||  || — || August 27, 2014 || Haleakala || Pan-STARRS ||  || align=right data-sort-value="0.69" | 690 m || 
|-id=928 bgcolor=#d6d6d6
| 594928 ||  || — || April 21, 2009 || Kitt Peak || Spacewatch ||  || align=right | 2.3 km || 
|-id=929 bgcolor=#d6d6d6
| 594929 ||  || — || July 5, 2003 || Kitt Peak || Spacewatch ||  || align=right | 3.8 km || 
|-id=930 bgcolor=#d6d6d6
| 594930 ||  || — || October 13, 2015 || Haleakala || Pan-STARRS ||  || align=right | 2.4 km || 
|-id=931 bgcolor=#d6d6d6
| 594931 ||  || — || May 15, 2009 || Kitt Peak || Spacewatch ||  || align=right | 2.0 km || 
|-id=932 bgcolor=#C2FFFF
| 594932 ||  || — || November 10, 2010 || Mount Lemmon || Mount Lemmon Survey || L4 || align=right | 6.1 km || 
|-id=933 bgcolor=#C2FFFF
| 594933 ||  || — || January 17, 2013 || Haleakala || Pan-STARRS || L4 || align=right | 6.2 km || 
|-id=934 bgcolor=#E9E9E9
| 594934 ||  || — || November 2, 2011 || Mount Lemmon || Mount Lemmon Survey ||  || align=right | 1.2 km || 
|-id=935 bgcolor=#d6d6d6
| 594935 ||  || — || March 13, 2011 || Mount Lemmon || Mount Lemmon Survey ||  || align=right | 1.8 km || 
|-id=936 bgcolor=#FFC2E0
| 594936 ||  || — || March 7, 2021 || Palomar || PTF || APO +1km || align=right | 1.00 km || 
|-id=937 bgcolor=#fefefe
| 594937 ||  || — || March 25, 2010 || Kitt Peak || Spacewatch ||  || align=right data-sort-value="0.53" | 530 m || 
|-id=938 bgcolor=#FFC2E0
| 594938 ||  || — || April 10, 2021 || Haleakala || Pan-STARRS 2 || AMO +1km || align=right data-sort-value="0.80" | 800 m || 
|-id=939 bgcolor=#d6d6d6
| 594939 ||  || — || February 15, 2010 || Kitt Peak || Spacewatch ||  || align=right | 2.0 km || 
|-id=940 bgcolor=#d6d6d6
| 594940 ||  || — || January 28, 2007 || Mount Lemmon || Mount Lemmon Survey ||  || align=right | 2.0 km || 
|-id=941 bgcolor=#fefefe
| 594941 ||  || — || December 16, 2007 || Mount Lemmon || Mount Lemmon Survey ||  || align=right data-sort-value="0.60" | 600 m || 
|-id=942 bgcolor=#d6d6d6
| 594942 ||  || — || January 27, 2019 || Mount Lemmon || Mount Lemmon Survey ||  || align=right | 2.4 km || 
|-id=943 bgcolor=#d6d6d6
| 594943 ||  || — || April 16, 2020 || Mount Lemmon || Mount Lemmon Survey ||  || align=right | 2.4 km || 
|-id=944 bgcolor=#fefefe
| 594944 ||  || — || January 8, 2000 || Kitt Peak || Spacewatch ||  || align=right data-sort-value="0.80" | 800 m || 
|-id=945 bgcolor=#C2FFFF
| 594945 ||  || — || January 5, 2000 || Kitt Peak || Spacewatch || L4 || align=right | 6.9 km || 
|-id=946 bgcolor=#E9E9E9
| 594946 ||  || — || July 27, 2011 || Haleakala || Pan-STARRS ||  || align=right | 1.2 km || 
|-id=947 bgcolor=#fefefe
| 594947 ||  || — || October 22, 2006 || Kitt Peak || Spacewatch ||  || align=right data-sort-value="0.52" | 520 m || 
|-id=948 bgcolor=#E9E9E9
| 594948 ||  || — || January 28, 2000 || Kitt Peak || Spacewatch ||  || align=right | 1.5 km || 
|-id=949 bgcolor=#fefefe
| 594949 ||  || — || January 29, 2000 || Kitt Peak || Spacewatch ||  || align=right data-sort-value="0.58" | 580 m || 
|-id=950 bgcolor=#d6d6d6
| 594950 ||  || — || January 30, 2000 || Kitt Peak || Spacewatch ||  || align=right | 2.8 km || 
|-id=951 bgcolor=#fefefe
| 594951 ||  || — || February 1, 2000 || Kitt Peak || Spacewatch ||  || align=right data-sort-value="0.67" | 670 m || 
|-id=952 bgcolor=#E9E9E9
| 594952 ||  || — || February 5, 2000 || Kitt Peak || Spacewatch ||  || align=right | 1.7 km || 
|-id=953 bgcolor=#E9E9E9
| 594953 ||  || — || February 5, 2000 || Kitt Peak || Kitt Peak Obs. || critical || align=right | 1.1 km || 
|-id=954 bgcolor=#FA8072
| 594954 ||  || — || February 3, 2000 || Socorro || LINEAR ||  || align=right data-sort-value="0.61" | 610 m || 
|-id=955 bgcolor=#d6d6d6
| 594955 ||  || — || February 4, 2000 || Kitt Peak || Spacewatch ||  || align=right | 2.4 km || 
|-id=956 bgcolor=#E9E9E9
| 594956 ||  || — || February 3, 2000 || Kitt Peak || Spacewatch ||  || align=right | 1.8 km || 
|-id=957 bgcolor=#E9E9E9
| 594957 ||  || — || September 14, 2007 || Mount Lemmon || Mount Lemmon Survey ||  || align=right | 1.7 km || 
|-id=958 bgcolor=#d6d6d6
| 594958 ||  || — || February 8, 2000 || Kitt Peak || Spacewatch ||  || align=right | 2.5 km || 
|-id=959 bgcolor=#d6d6d6
| 594959 ||  || — || January 10, 2008 || Kitt Peak || Spacewatch || 3:2 || align=right | 3.3 km || 
|-id=960 bgcolor=#fefefe
| 594960 ||  || — || June 17, 2005 || Mount Lemmon || Mount Lemmon Survey ||  || align=right | 1.0 km || 
|-id=961 bgcolor=#E9E9E9
| 594961 ||  || — || September 12, 2002 || Palomar || NEAT ||  || align=right | 2.3 km || 
|-id=962 bgcolor=#E9E9E9
| 594962 ||  || — || January 1, 2009 || Mount Lemmon || Mount Lemmon Survey ||  || align=right | 2.1 km || 
|-id=963 bgcolor=#E9E9E9
| 594963 ||  || — || October 4, 2007 || Kitt Peak || Spacewatch ||  || align=right | 1.9 km || 
|-id=964 bgcolor=#fefefe
| 594964 ||  || — || November 8, 2010 || Mount Lemmon || Mount Lemmon Survey ||  || align=right data-sort-value="0.58" | 580 m || 
|-id=965 bgcolor=#fefefe
| 594965 ||  || — || October 10, 2008 || Mount Lemmon || Mount Lemmon Survey ||  || align=right data-sort-value="0.80" | 800 m || 
|-id=966 bgcolor=#E9E9E9
| 594966 ||  || — || February 28, 2014 || Haleakala || Pan-STARRS ||  || align=right | 1.7 km || 
|-id=967 bgcolor=#fefefe
| 594967 ||  || — || August 29, 2005 || Kitt Peak || Spacewatch ||  || align=right data-sort-value="0.56" | 560 m || 
|-id=968 bgcolor=#fefefe
| 594968 ||  || — || September 25, 2009 || Kitt Peak || Spacewatch ||  || align=right data-sort-value="0.67" | 670 m || 
|-id=969 bgcolor=#d6d6d6
| 594969 ||  || — || March 3, 2000 || Kitt Peak || Spacewatch ||  || align=right | 2.5 km || 
|-id=970 bgcolor=#fefefe
| 594970 ||  || — || April 24, 2004 || Kitt Peak || Spacewatch ||  || align=right data-sort-value="0.77" | 770 m || 
|-id=971 bgcolor=#d6d6d6
| 594971 ||  || — || July 18, 2001 || Palomar || NEAT ||  || align=right | 3.0 km || 
|-id=972 bgcolor=#E9E9E9
| 594972 ||  || — || September 21, 2011 || Haleakala || Pan-STARRS ||  || align=right | 1.0 km || 
|-id=973 bgcolor=#E9E9E9
| 594973 ||  || — || March 11, 2005 || Kitt Peak || Spacewatch ||  || align=right | 1.8 km || 
|-id=974 bgcolor=#fefefe
| 594974 ||  || — || March 4, 2000 || Apache Point || SDSS Collaboration ||  || align=right data-sort-value="0.94" | 940 m || 
|-id=975 bgcolor=#E9E9E9
| 594975 ||  || — || March 29, 2000 || Kitt Peak || Spacewatch ||  || align=right | 2.3 km || 
|-id=976 bgcolor=#fefefe
| 594976 ||  || — || September 11, 2016 || Mount Lemmon || Mount Lemmon Survey ||  || align=right data-sort-value="0.63" | 630 m || 
|-id=977 bgcolor=#E9E9E9
| 594977 ||  || — || April 5, 2000 || Socorro || LINEAR ||  || align=right | 2.8 km || 
|-id=978 bgcolor=#fefefe
| 594978 ||  || — || April 5, 2000 || Socorro || LINEAR ||  || align=right data-sort-value="0.86" | 860 m || 
|-id=979 bgcolor=#fefefe
| 594979 ||  || — || January 27, 2011 || Mount Lemmon || Mount Lemmon Survey ||  || align=right data-sort-value="0.70" | 700 m || 
|-id=980 bgcolor=#E9E9E9
| 594980 ||  || — || February 11, 2014 || Mount Lemmon || Mount Lemmon Survey ||  || align=right | 2.0 km || 
|-id=981 bgcolor=#fefefe
| 594981 ||  || — || March 1, 2011 || Mount Lemmon || Mount Lemmon Survey ||  || align=right data-sort-value="0.87" | 870 m || 
|-id=982 bgcolor=#fefefe
| 594982 ||  || — || September 23, 2004 || Kitt Peak || Spacewatch ||  || align=right data-sort-value="0.67" | 670 m || 
|-id=983 bgcolor=#d6d6d6
| 594983 ||  || — || May 24, 2000 || Mauna Kea || C. Veillet ||  || align=right | 2.1 km || 
|-id=984 bgcolor=#fefefe
| 594984 ||  || — || June 3, 2000 || Haleakala || AMOS ||  || align=right | 1.4 km || 
|-id=985 bgcolor=#d6d6d6
| 594985 ||  || — || July 31, 2000 || Cerro Tololo || M. W. Buie, S. D. Kern ||  || align=right | 1.8 km || 
|-id=986 bgcolor=#E9E9E9
| 594986 ||  || — || July 31, 2000 || Cerro Tololo || M. W. Buie, S. D. Kern ||  || align=right data-sort-value="0.93" | 930 m || 
|-id=987 bgcolor=#E9E9E9
| 594987 ||  || — || April 13, 2011 || Mount Lemmon || Mount Lemmon Survey ||  || align=right data-sort-value="0.83" | 830 m || 
|-id=988 bgcolor=#E9E9E9
| 594988 ||  || — || April 13, 2011 || Mount Lemmon || Mount Lemmon Survey ||  || align=right data-sort-value="0.81" | 810 m || 
|-id=989 bgcolor=#d6d6d6
| 594989 ||  || — || May 7, 2014 || Haleakala || Pan-STARRS ||  || align=right | 1.7 km || 
|-id=990 bgcolor=#fefefe
| 594990 ||  || — || January 26, 2012 || Mount Lemmon || Mount Lemmon Survey ||  || align=right data-sort-value="0.45" | 450 m || 
|-id=991 bgcolor=#fefefe
| 594991 ||  || — || January 14, 2002 || Kitt Peak || Spacewatch ||  || align=right data-sort-value="0.56" | 560 m || 
|-id=992 bgcolor=#d6d6d6
| 594992 ||  || — || August 1, 2000 || Cerro Tololo || M. W. Buie, S. D. Kern ||  || align=right | 1.9 km || 
|-id=993 bgcolor=#d6d6d6
| 594993 ||  || — || August 26, 2000 || Cerro Tololo || R. Millis, L. H. Wasserman ||  || align=right | 1.8 km || 
|-id=994 bgcolor=#C2E0FF
| 594994 ||  || — || August 25, 2000 || Cerro Tololo || R. Millis, L. H. Wasserman || plutinocritical || align=right | 152 km || 
|-id=995 bgcolor=#E9E9E9
| 594995 ||  || — || April 19, 2015 || Kitt Peak || Spacewatch ||  || align=right data-sort-value="0.83" | 830 m || 
|-id=996 bgcolor=#fefefe
| 594996 ||  || — || August 10, 2007 || Kitt Peak || Spacewatch ||  || align=right data-sort-value="0.68" | 680 m || 
|-id=997 bgcolor=#E9E9E9
| 594997 ||  || — || November 27, 2013 || Haleakala || Pan-STARRS ||  || align=right data-sort-value="0.75" | 750 m || 
|-id=998 bgcolor=#fefefe
| 594998 ||  || — || August 26, 2000 || Cerro Tololo || R. Millis, L. H. Wasserman ||  || align=right data-sort-value="0.54" | 540 m || 
|-id=999 bgcolor=#d6d6d6
| 594999 ||  || — || December 17, 2007 || Kitt Peak || Spacewatch ||  || align=right | 1.6 km || 
|-id=000 bgcolor=#FA8072
| 595000 ||  || — || September 1, 2000 || Socorro || LINEAR ||  || align=right data-sort-value="0.85" | 850 m || 
|}

References

External links 
 Discovery Circumstances: Numbered Minor Planets (590001)–(595000) (IAU Minor Planet Center)

0594